The history of Australia is the story of the land and peoples of the continent of Australia.

People first arrived on the Australian mainland by sea from Maritime Southeast Asia between 50,000 and 65,000 years ago, and penetrated to all parts of the continent, from the rainforests in the north, the deserts of the centre, and the sub-Antarctic islands of Tasmania and Bass Strait. The artistic, musical and spiritual traditions they established are among the longest surviving such traditions in human history.

The first Torres Strait Islanders – ethnically and culturally distinct from the Aboriginal people – arrived from what is now Papua New Guinea around 2,500 years ago, and settled in the islands of the Torres Strait and the Cape York Peninsula forming the northern tip of the Australian landmass.

The first known landing in Australia by Europeans was in 1606 by Dutch navigator Willem Janszoon on Australia's northern coast. Later that year, Spanish explorer Luís Vaz de Torres sailed through, and navigated, what is now called Torres Strait and associated islands. Twenty-nine other Dutch navigators explored the western and southern coasts in the 17th century and named the continent New Holland. Macassan trepangers visited Australia's northern coasts after 1720, possibly earlier. Other European explorers followed until, in 1770, Lieutenant James Cook charted the east coast of Australia and claimed it for Great Britain. He returned to London with accounts favouring colonisation at Botany Bay (now in Sydney).

The First Fleet of British ships arrived at Botany Bay in January 1788 to establish a penal colony, the first colony on the Australian mainland. In the century that followed, the British established other colonies on the continent, and European explorers ventured into its interior. Aboriginal people were greatly weakened and their numbers diminished by introduced diseases and conflict with the colonists during this period.

Gold rushes and agricultural industries brought prosperity. Transportation of British convicts to Australia was phased out from 1840 to 1868. Autonomous parliamentary democracies began to be established throughout the six British colonies from the mid-19th century. The colonies voted by referendum to unite in a federation in 1901, and modern Australia came into being. Australia fought as part of British Empire and later Commonwealth in the two world wars and was to become a long-standing ally of the United States when threatened by Imperial Japan during World War II. Trade with Asia increased and a post-war immigration program received more than 6.5 million migrants from every continent. Supported by immigration of people from almost every country in the world since the end of World War II, the population increased to more than 25.5 million by 2020, with 30 per cent of the population born overseas.

Indigenous prehistory

Humans are believed to have arrived in Australia 50,000 to 65,000 years ago. As hunter-gatherers, they established enduring spiritual and artistic traditions and used a range of implements adapted to their environments. Recent estimates of the population at the time of British settlement range from 500,000 to one million.

There is considerable archaeological discussion as to the route taken by the first population. People appear to have arrived by sea during a period of glaciation, when New Guinea and Tasmania were joined to the continent; however, the journey still required sea travel, making them among the world's earliest mariners. Scott Cane wrote in 2013 that the first wave may have been prompted by the eruption of Lake Toba. If they arrived about 70,000 years ago, they could have crossed the water from Timor, when the sea level was low, but if they came later, around 50,000 years ago, a more likely route would have been through the Moluccas to New Guinea. Given that the likely landfall regions have been under approximately 50 metres of water for the past 15,000 years, it is unlikely that the timing will ever be established with certainty.

The oldest known sites of human occupation in Australia are in Arnhem Land in the north of the continent and have been dated to between 50,000 and 65,000 BP. The population spread into a range of very different environments. Devil's Lair in the extreme south-west of the continent was occupied around 47,000 BP and Tasmania by 39,000 BP. The earliest known human remains in Australia, found at Lake Mungo, a dry lake in the southwest of New South Wales, are about 40,000 years old. Remains found at Mungo suggest one of the world's oldest known cremations, thus indicating early evidence for religious ritual among humans.

The spread of the population also altered the environment. There is evidence of the deliberate use of fire to shape the Australian environment 46,000 years ago. In many parts of Australia, firestick farming was used to clear vegetation to make travel easier, drive animals into ambushes, and create open grasslands rich in animal and vegetable food sources. More than 60 species of animals, including Australian megafauna, became extinct by 10,000 ago. Researchers have variously attributed these extinctions to human hunting and firing practices, climate change or a combination of these factors.

The inhabitants developed other technologies to better exploit diverse environments. Fibre and nets for use in watercraft and fishing developed before 40,000 BP. More complex tools, such as edge-ground axes hafted to wooden handles, appeared by 35,000 BP.  Elaborate trade networks also developed. Ochre was transported 250 kilometres from the Barrier Range to Lake Mungo 40,000 years ago.  Shells (for decorative beads) were transported 500 kilometres by 30,000 BP. More extensive trade networks developed in later times.

The earliest Aboriginal rock art consists of hand-prints, hand-stencils, and engravings of circles, tracks, lines and cupules, and has been dated to 35,000 years ago. Around 20,000 year ago Aboriginal artists were depicting humans and animals. However, the dating is contentious and some researchers believe that known examples of Aboriginal rock art are possibly more recent.

The Aboriginal population was confronted with significant changes to climate and environment. About 30,000 years ago, sea levels began to fall, temperatures in the south-east of the continent dropped by as much as 9 degrees Celsius, and the interior of Australia became more arid. About 20,000 years ago, New Guinea and Tasmania were connected to the Australian continent, which was more than a quarter larger than today.

About 19,000 years ago temperatures and sea levels began to rise. Tasmania became separated from the mainland some 14,000 years ago, and between 8,000 and 6,000 years ago thousands of islands in the Torres Strait and around the coast of Australia were formed. Josephine Flood writes that the flooding and loss of land as coastlines receded might have led to greater emphasis on territorial boundaries separating groups, stronger clan identity, and the development of the Rainbow Serpent and other mythologies.

The warmer climate was associated with new technologies. Small back-bladed stone tools appeared 15–19 thousand years ago. Wooden javelins and boomerangs have been found dating from 10,000 years ago. Stone points for spears have been found dating from 5–7 thousand years ago. Spear throwers were probably developed more recently than 6,500 years ago.

Sea levels stabilised at around their current level about 6,500 years ago. Warmer weather, wetter conditions and the new coastlines led to significant changes in Aboriginal social and economic organisation. New coastal societies emerged around tidal reefs, estuaries and flooded river valleys, and coastal islands were incorporated into local economies.  There was a proliferation of stone tool, plant processing and landscape modification technologies. Elaborate fish and eel traps involving channels up to three kilometres long were in use in western Victoria from about 6,500 years ago. Semi-permanent collections of wooden huts on mounds also appeared in western Victoria, associated with a more systematic exploitation of new food sources in the wetlands.

Aboriginal Tasmanians were isolated from the mainland from about 14,000 years ago. As a result, they only possessed one quarter of the tools and equipment of the adjacent mainland and were without hafted axes, grinding technology, stone tipped weapons, spear throwers and the boomerang. By 3,700 BP they had ceased to eat fish and use bone tools. Coastal Tasmanians switched from fish to abalone and crayfish and more Tasmanians moved to the interior. The Tasmanians built watercraft from reeds and bark and journeyed up to 10 kilometres offshore to visit islands and hunt for seals and muttonbirds.

Around 4,000 years ago the first phase of occupation of the Torres Strait Islands began. By 2,500 years ago more of the islands were occupied and a distinctive Torres Strait Island maritime culture emerged. Agriculture also developed on some islands and by 700 years ago villages appeared.

One genetic study in 2012 has suggested that about 4,000 years ago, some Indian explorers settled in Australia and assimilated into the local population. However, more recent studies do not support this view.

Nevertheless, some innovations were imported to the mainland from neighbouring cultures. The dingo was introduced about 4,000 years ago. Shell fish hooks appeared in Australia about 1,200 years ago and were probably introduced from the Torres Strait or by Polynesian seafarers. From the mid-1660s fishing vessels from Indonesia regularly visited the north coast of Australia in search of trepang (sea cucumber). Trade and social relationships developed which were reflected in Aboriginal art, ceremonies and oral traditions. Aboriginal people adopted dugout canoes and metal harpoon heads from the Indonesians which allowed them to better hunt dugong and turtle off the coast and nearby islands.

Despite these interactions with neighbouring cultures, the basic structure of Aboriginal society was unchanged. Family groups were joined in bands and clans averaging about 25 people, each with a defined territory for foraging.  Clans were attached to tribes or nations, associated with particular languages and country. At the time of European contact there were about 600 tribes or nations and 250 distinct languages with various dialects.

Aboriginal society was egalitarian with no formal government or chiefs. Authority rested with elders who held extensive ritual knowledge gained over many years. Group decisions were generally made through the consensus of elders. The traditional economy was cooperative, with males generally hunting large game while females gathered local staples such as small animals, shellfish, vegetables, fruits, seeds and nuts. Food was shared within groups and exchanged across groups.

Aboriginal groups were semi-nomadic, generally ranging over a specific territory defined by natural features. Members of a group would enter the territory of another group through rights established by marriage and kinship or by invitation for specific purposes such as ceremonies and sharing abundant seasonal foods. As all natural features of the land were created by ancestral beings, a group's particular country provided physical and spiritual nourishment.

According to Australian Aboriginal mythology and the animist framework developed in Aboriginal Australia, the Dreaming is a sacred era in which ancestral totemic spirit beings formed The Creation. The Dreaming established the laws and structures of society and the ceremonies performed to ensure continuity of life and land.

The extent to which some Aboriginal societies were agricultural is controversial. In the Lake Condah region of western Victoria the inhabitants built elaborate eel and fish traps and hundreds gathered in semi-permanent stone and bark huts during the eel season. However, these groups still moved across their territory several times a year to exploit other seasonal food sources. In semi-arid areas, millet was harvested, stacked and threshed and the seeds stored for later use. In tropical areas the tops of yams were replanted. Flood argues that such practices are better classified as resource management than agriculture and that Aboriginal societies did not develop the systematic cultivation of crops or permanent villages such as existed in the Torres Strait Islands. Elizabeth Williams has called the inhabitants of the more settled regions of the Murray valley "complex hunter gatherers".

Early European exploration

Dutch discovery and exploration

Although a theory of Portuguese discovery in the 1520s exists, it lacks definitive evidence. The Dutch East India Company ship, Duyfken, captained by Willem Janszoon, made the first documented European landing in Australia in 1606. That same year, a Spanish expedition sailing in nearby waters and led by Portuguese navigator Pedro Fernandes de Queirós had landed in the New Hebrides and, believing them to be the fabled southern continent, named the land "Austrialia del Espiritu Santo" (Southern Land of the Holy Spirit), in honour of his queen Margaret of Austria, the wife of Philip III of Spain. Later that year, Queirós' deputy Luís Vaz de Torres sailed to the north of Australia through Torres Strait, along New Guinea's southern coast.

The Dutch contributed a great deal to Europe's knowledge of Australia's coast. In 1616, Dirk Hartog, sailing off course, en route from the Cape of Good Hope to Batavia, landed on an island off Shark Bay, Western Australia. In 1622–23 the ship Leeuwin made the first recorded rounding of the southwest corner of the continent, where Cape Leeuwin was later named after her (the name of the ship's captain is lost).

In 1627, the south coast of Australia was accidentally discovered by François Thijssen and named t Land van Pieter Nuyts, in honour of the highest ranking passenger, Pieter Nuyts, extraordinary Councillor of India. In 1628, a squadron of Dutch ships was sent by the Governor-General of the Dutch East Indies Pieter de Carpentier to explore the northern coast. These ships made extensive examinations, particularly in the Gulf of Carpentaria, named in honour of de Carpentier.

Abel Tasman's voyage of 1642 was the first known European expedition to reach Van Diemen's Land (later Tasmania) and New Zealand, and to sight Fiji. On his second voyage of 1644, he also contributed significantly to the mapping of the Australian mainland (which he called New Holland), making observations on the land and people of the north coast below New Guinea.

Following Tasman's voyages, the Dutch were able to make almost complete maps of Australia's northern and western coasts and much of its southern and south-eastern Tasmanian coasts, as reflected in the 1648 map by Joan Blaeu, Nova et Accuratissima Terrarum Orbis Tabula.

British and French exploration

William Dampier, an English buccaneer and explorer, landed on the north-west coast of New Holland in 1688 and again in 1699, and published influential descriptions of the Aboriginal people.

Cook also carried secret Admiralty instructions to locate the supposed Southern Continent. This continent was not found, a disappointment to Alexander Dalrymple and his fellow members of the Royal Society who had urged the Admiralty to undertake this mission. Cook decided to survey the east coast of New Holland, the only major part of that continent that had not been charted by Dutch navigators.

On 19 April 1770 the Endeavour reached the east coast of New Holland and ten days later anchored at Botany Bay. Cook charted the coast to its northern extent and formally took possession of the east coast of New Holland on 21/22 August 1770 when on Possession Island off the west coast of Cape York Peninsula.

He noted in his journal that he could "land no more upon this Eastern coast of New Holland, and on the Western side I can make no new discovery the honour of which belongs to the Dutch Navigators and as such they may lay Claim to it as their property [italicised words crossed out in the original] but the Eastern Coast from the Latitude of 38 South down to this place I am confident was never seen or viseted by any European before us and therefore by the same Rule belongs to great Brittan" [italicised words crossed out in the original].

In March 1772 Marc-Joseph Marion du Fresne, in command of two French ships, reached Van Diemen's land on his way to Tahiti and the South Seas. His party became the first recorded Europeans to encounter the Indigenous Tasmanians and to kill one of them.

In the same year, a French expedition led by Louis Aleno de St Aloüarn, became the first Europeans to formally claim sovereignty over the west coast of Australia, but no attempt was made to follow this with colonisation.

Colonisation

Plans for colonisation before 1788

Although various proposals for the colonisation of Australia were made prior to 1788, none were attempted. In 1717, Jean-Pierre Purry sent a plan to the Dutch East India Company for the colonisation of an area in modern South Australia. The company rejected the plan with the comment that, "There is no prospect of use or benefit to the Company in it, but rather very certain and heavy costs".

In contrast, Emanuel Bowen, in 1747, promoted the benefits of exploring and colonising the country, writing:

John Harris' Navigantium atque Itinerantium Bibliotheca, or Voyages and Travels (1744–1748, 1764) recommended exploration of the east coast of New Holland, with a view to a British colonisation, by way of Abel Tasman's route to Van Diemen's Land.

John Callander put forward a proposal in 1766 for Britain to found a colony of banished convicts in the South Sea or in Terra Australis to enable the mother country to exploit the riches of those regions. He said: "this world must present us with many things entirely new, as hitherto we have had little more knowledge of it, than if it had lain in another planet".

Sweden's King Gustav III had ambitions to establish a colony for his country at the Swan River in 1786 but the plan was stillborn.

Sixteen years after Cook's landfall on the east coast of Australia, the British government decided to establish a colony at Botany Bay.

The American Revolutionary War (1775–1783) saw Britain lose most of its North American colonies and consider establishing replacement territories. Britain had transported about 50,000 convicts to the New World from 1718 to 1775 and was now searching for an alternative. The temporary solution of floating prison hulks had reached capacity and was a public health hazard, while the option of building more jails and workhouses was deemed too expensive.

In 1779, Sir Joseph Banks, the eminent scientist who had accompanied James Cook on his 1770 voyage, recommended Botany Bay as a suitable site for a penal settlement. Banks's plan was to send 200 to 300 convicts to Botany Bay where they could be left to their own devices and not be a burden on the British taxpayer.

Under Banks's guidance, the American Loyalist James Matra, who had also travelled with Cook, produced a new plan for colonising New South Wales in 1783. Matra argued that the country was suitable for plantations of sugar, cotton and tobacco; New Zealand timber and hemp or flax could prove valuable commodities; it could form a base for Pacific trade; and it could be a suitable compensation for displaced American Loyalists. Following an interview with Secretary of State Lord Sydney in 1784, Matra amended his proposal to include convicts as settlers, considering that this would benefit both "Economy to the Publick, & Humanity to the Individual".

The London newspapers announced in November 1784 that: "A plan has been presented to the [Prime] Minister, and is now before the Cabinet, for instituting a new colony in New Holland. In this vast tract of land....every sort of produce and improvement of which the various soils of the earth are capable, may be expected".

The major alternative to Botany Bay was sending convicts to Africa. From 1775 convicts had been sent to garrison British forts in west Africa, but the experiment had proved unsuccessful. In 1783, the Pitt government considered exiling convicts to a small river island in Gambia where they could form a self-governing community, a "colony of thieves", at no expense to the government.

In 1785, a parliamentary select committee chaired by Lord Beauchamp recommended against the Gambia plan, but failed to endorse the alternative of Botany Bay. In a second report, Beauchamp recommended a penal settlement at Das Voltas Bay in modern Namibia. The plan was dropped, however, when an investigation of the site in 1786 found it to be unsuitable. Two weeks later, In August 1786, the Pitt government announced its intention to send convicts to Botany Bay. The Government incorporated the settlement of Norfolk Island into their plan, with its attractions of timber and flax, proposed by Banks's Royal Society colleagues, Sir John Call and Sir George Young.

There has been a longstanding debate over whether the key consideration in the decision to establish a penal colony at Botany Bay was the pressing need to find a solution to the penal management problem, or whether broader imperial goals — such as trade, securing new supplies of timber and flax for the navy, and the desirability of strategic ports in the region — were paramount. Leading historians in the debate have included Sir Ernest Scott, Geoffrey Blainey, and Alan Frost.

The decision to settle was taken when it seemed the outbreak of civil war in the Netherlands might precipitate a war in which Britain would be again confronted with the alliance of the three naval Powers, France, Holland and Spain, which had brought her to defeat in 1783. Under these circumstances a naval base in New South Wales which could facilitate attacks on Dutch and Spanish interests in the region would be attractive. Specific plans for using the colony as a strategic base against Spanish interests were occasionally made after 1788, but never implemented.

Macintyre argues that the evidence for a military-strategic motive in establishing the colony is largely circumstantial and hard to reconcile with the strict ban on establishing a shipyard in the colony.  Karskens points out that the instructions provided to the first five governors of New South Wales show that the initial plans for the colony were limited. The settlement was to be a self-sufficient penal colony based on subsistence agriculture. Trade, shipping and ship building were banned in order to keep the convicts isolated and so as not to interfere with the trade monopoly of the British East India Company. There was no plan for economic development apart from investigating the possibility of producing raw materials for Britain. Christopher and Maxwell-Stewart argue that whatever the government's original motives were in establishing the colony, by the 1790s it had at least achieved the imperial objective of providing a harbour where vessels could be careened and resupplied.

The colony of New South Wales

Establishment of the colony: 1788 to 1792 

The territory of New South Wales claimed by Britain included all of Australia eastward of the meridian of 135° East. This included more than half of mainland Australia and reflected the line of division between the claims of Spain and Portugal established in the Treaty of Tordesillas in 1494. Watkin Tench subsequently commented in A Narrative of the Expedition to Botany Bay, "By this partition, it may be fairly presumed, that every source of future litigation between the Dutch and us, will be for ever cut off, as the discoveries of English navigators only are comprized in this territory".

The claim also included "all the Islands adjacent in the Pacific" between the latitudes of Cape York and the southern tip of Van Diemen's Land (Tasmania). King argues that an unofficial British map published in 1786 (A General Chart of New Holland) showed the possible extend of this claim. In 1817, the British government withdrew the extensive territorial claim over the South Pacific, passing an act specifying that Tahiti, New Zealand and other islands of the South Pacific were not within His Majesty's dominions. However, it is unclear whether the claim ever extended to the current islands of New Zealand.

The colony of New South Wales was established with the arrival of the First Fleet of 11 vessels under the command of Captain Arthur Phillip in January 1788. It consisted of more than a thousand settlers, including 778 convicts (192 women and 586 men). A few days after arrival at Botany Bay the fleet moved to the more suitable Port Jackson where a settlement was established at Sydney Cove on 26 January 1788. This date later became Australia's national day, Australia Day. The colony was formally proclaimed by Governor Phillip on 7 February 1788 at Sydney. Sydney Cove offered a fresh water supply and a safe harbour, which Philip described as being, 'with out exception the finest Harbour in the World [...] Here a Thousand Sail of the Line may ride in the most perfect Security'.

Governor Phillip was vested with complete authority over the inhabitants of the colony. His personal intent was to establish harmonious relations with local Aboriginal people and try to reform as well as discipline the convicts of the colony. Phillip and several of his officers—most notably Watkin Tench—left behind journals and accounts of which tell of immense hardships during the first years of settlement. Often Phillip's officers despaired for the future of New South Wales. Early efforts at agriculture were fraught and supplies from overseas were scarce. Between 1788 and 1792 about 3546 male and 766 female convicts were landed at Sydney. Many new arrivals were sick or unfit for work and the conditions of healthy convicts only deteriorated with hard labour and poor sustenance in the settlement. The food situation reached crisis point in 1790 and the Second Fleet which finally arrived in June 1790 had lost a quarter of its 'passengers' through sickness, while the condition of the convicts of the Third Fleet appalled Phillip; however, from 1791 the more regular arrival of ships and the beginnings of trade lessened the feeling of isolation and improved supplies.

In 1788, Phillip established a subsidiary settlement on Norfolk Island in the South Pacific where he hoped to obtain timber and flax for the navy. The island, however, had no safe harbour, which led the settlement to be abandoned and the settlers evacuated to Tasmania in 1807. The island was subsequently re-established as a site for secondary transportation in 1825.

Phillip sent exploratory missions in search of better soils, fixed on the Parramatta region as a promising area for expansion, and moved many of the convicts from late 1788 to establish a small township, which became the main centre of the colony's economic life. This left Sydney Cove only as an important port and focus of social life. Poor equipment and unfamiliar soils and climate continued to hamper the expansion of farming from Farm Cove to Parramatta and Toongabbie, but a building program, assisted by convict labour, advanced steadily. Between 1788 and 1792, convicts and their gaolers made up the majority of the population; however, a free population soon began to grow, consisting of emancipated convicts, locally born children, soldiers whose military service had expired and, finally, free settlers from Britain. Governor Phillip departed the colony for England on 11 December 1792, with the new settlement having survived near starvation and immense isolation for four years.

A number of foreign commentators pointed to the strategic importance of the new colony. Spanish naval commander Alessandro Malaspina, who visited Sydney in March–April 1793 reported to his government that: "The transportation of the convicts constituted the means and not the object of the enterprise. The extension of dominion, mercantile speculations and the discovery of mines were the real object." Frenchman François Péron, of the Baudin expedition visited Sydney in 1802 and reported to the French Government: "How can it be conceived that such a monstrous invasion was accomplished, with no complaint in Europe to protest against it? How can it be conceived that Spain, who had previously raised so many objections opposing the occupation of the Malouines (Falkland Islands), meekly allowed a formidable empire to arise to facing her richest possessions, an empire which must either invade or liberate them?"

King points out that supporters of the penal colony frequently compared the venture to the foundation of Rome, and that the first Great Seal of New South Wales alluded to this. Phillip, however, wrote, "I would not wish Convicts to lay the foundations of an Empire...[.]"

Consolidation: 1793 to 1821 
After the departure of Phillip, the colony's military officers began acquiring land and importing consumer goods obtained from visiting ships. Former convicts also farmed land granted to them and engaged in trade. Farms spread to the more fertile lands surrounding Paramatta, Windsor and Camden, and by 1803 the colony was self-sufficient in grain. Boat building developed in order to make travel easier and exploit the marine resources of the coastal settlements. Sealing and whaling became important industries.

The New South Wales Corps was formed in England in 1789 as a permanent regiment of the British Army to relieve the marines who had accompanied the First Fleet. Officers of the Corps soon became involved in the corrupt and lucrative rum trade in the colony. Governor William Bligh (1806 - 1808) tried to suppress the rum trade and the illegal use of Crown Land, resulting in the Rum Rebellion of 1808. The Corps, working closely with the newly established wool trader John Macarthur, staged the only successful armed takeover of government in Australian history, deposing Bligh and instigating a brief period of military rule prior to the arrival from Britain of Governor Lachlan Macquarie in 1810.

Macquarie served as the last autocratic Governor of New South Wales, from 1810 to 1821, and had a leading role in the social and economic development of New South Wales which saw it transition from a penal colony to a budding civil society. He established a bank, a currency and a hospital. He employed a planner to design the street layout of Sydney and commissioned the construction of roads, wharves, churches, and public buildings. He sent explorers out from Sydney and, in 1815, a road across the Blue Mountains was completed, opening the way for large scale farming and grazing in the lightly-wooded pastures west of the Great Dividing Range.

Central to Macquarie's policy was his treatment of the emancipists, whom he considered should be treated as social equals to free-settlers in the colony. He appointed emancipists to key government positions including Francis Greenway as colonial architect and William Redfern as a magistrate. His policy on emancipists was opposed by many influential free settlers, officers and officials, and London became concerned at the cost of his public works. In 1819, London appointed J. T. Bigge to conduct an inquiry into the colony, and Macquarie resigned shortly before the report of the inquiry was published.

Expansion: 1821 to 1850 
In 1820, British settlement was largely confined to a 100 kilometre radius around Sydney and to the central plain of Van Diemen's land. The settler population was 26,000 on the mainland and 6,000 in Van Diemen's Land. Following the end of the Napoleonic Wars in 1815 the transportation of convicts increased rapidly and the number of free settlers grew steadily. From 1821 to 1840, 55,000 convicts arrived in New South Wales and 60,000 in Van Diemen's Land. However, by 1830, free settlers and the locally born exceeded the convict population of New South Wales.

From the 1820s squatters increasingly established unauthorised cattle and sheep runs beyond the official limits of the settled colony. In 1836, a system of annual licences authorising grazing on Crown Land was introduced in an attempt to control the pastoral industry, but booming wool prices and the high cost of land in the settled areas encouraged further squatting. By 1844 wool accounted for half of the colony's exports and by 1850 most of the eastern third of New South Wales was controlled by fewer than 2,000 pastoralists.

In 1825, the western boundary of New South Wales was extended to longitude 129° East, which is the current boundary of Western Australia. As a result, the territory of New South Wales reached its greatest extent, covering the area of the modern state as well as modern Queensland, Victoria, Tasmania, South Australia and the Northern Territory.

By 1850 the settler population of New South Wales had grown to 180,000, not including the 70–75 thousand living in the area which became the separate colony of Victoria in 1851.

Establishment of further colonies

Van Diemen's Land 

After hosting Nicholas Baudin's French naval expedition in Sydney in 1802,  Governor Phillip Gidley King decided to establish a settlement in Van Diemen's Land (modern Tasmania) in 1803, partly to forestall a possible French settlement. The British settlement of the island soon centred on Launceston in the north and Hobart in the south. For the first two decades the settlement relied heavily on convict labour, small-scale farming and sheep grazing, sealing, whaling and the "dog and kangaroo" economy where emancipists and escaped convicts hunted native game with guns and dogs.

From the 1820s free settlers were encouraged by the offer of land grants in proportion to the capital the settlers would bring. Almost 2 million acres of land was granted to free settlers in the decade, and the number of sheep in the island increased from 170,000 to a million. The land grants created a social division between large landowners and a majority of landless convicts and emancipists.

Van Diemen's Land became a separate colony from New South Wales in December 1825 and continued to expand through the 1830s, supported by farming, sheep grazing and whaling. Following the suspension of convict transportation to New South Wales in 1840, Van Diemen's land became the main destination for convicts. Transportation to Van Diemen's Land ended in 1853 and in 1856 the colony officially changed its name to Tasmania.

Victoria 

Pastoralists from Van Diemen's land began squatting in the Port Phillip hinterland on the mainland in 1834, attracted by its rich grasslands. In 1835, John Batman and others negotiated the transfer of 100,000 acres of land from the Kulin people. However, the treaty was annulled the same year when the British Colonial Office issued the Proclamation of Governor Bourke stating that all unalienated land in the colony was vacant Crown Land, irrespective of whether it was occupied by traditional landowners. Its publication meant that from then, all people found occupying land without the authority of the government would be considered illegal trespassers.

In 1836, Port Phillip was officially recognised as a district of New South Wales and opened for settlement. The main settlement of Melbourne was established in 1837 as a planned town on the instructions of Governor Bourke. Squatters and settlers from Van Diemen's Land and New South Wales soon arrived in large numbers, and by 1850 the district had a population of 75,000 Europeans, 2,000 Indigenous inhabitants and 5 million sheep. In 1851, the Port Phillip District separated from New South Wales as the colony of Victoria.

Western Australia 

In 1826, the governor of New South Wales, Ralph Darling, sent a military garrison to King George Sound (the basis of the later town of Albany), to deter the French from establishing a settlement in Western Australia. In 1827, the head of the expedition, Major Edmund Lockyer, formally annexed the western third of the continent as a British colony.

In 1829, the Swan River colony was established at the sites of modern Fremantle and Perth, becoming the first convict-free and privatised colony in Australia. However, much of the arable land was allocated to absentee owners and the development of the colony was hampered by poor soil, the dry climate, and a lack of capital and labour. By 1850 there were a little more than 5,000 settlers, half of them children. The colony accepted convicts from that year because of the acute shortage of labour.

South Australia 

The Province of South Australia was established in 1836 as a privately financed settlement based on the theory of "systematic colonisation" developed by Edward Gibbon Wakefield. The intention was to found a free colony based on private investment at little cost to the British government. Power was divided between the Crown and a Board of Commissioners of Colonisation, responsible to about 300 shareholders. Settlement was to be controlled to promote a balance between land, capital and labour. Convict labour was banned in the hope of making the colony more attractive to "respectable" families and promote an even balance between male and female settlers. The city of Adelaide was to be planned with a generous provision of churches, parks and schools. Land was to be sold at a uniform price and the proceeds used to secure an adequate supply of labour through selective assisted migration. Various religious, personal and commercial freedoms were guaranteed, and the Letters Patent enabling the South Australia Act 1834 included a guarantee of the rights of 'any Aboriginal Natives' and their descendants to lands they 'now actually occupied or enjoyed'.

The colony was badly hit by the depression of 1841–44, and overproduction of wheat and overinvestment in infrastructure almost bankrupted it. Conflict with Indigenous traditional landowners also reduced the protections they had been promised. In 1842, the settlement became a Crown colony administered by the governor and an appointed Legislative Council. The economy recovered from 1845, supported by wheat farming, sheep grazing and a boom in copper mining. By 1850 the settler population had grown to 60,000 and the following year the colony achieved limited self-government with a partially elected Legislative Council.

Queensland 

In 1824, the Moreton Bay penal settlement was established on the site of present day Brisbane as a place of secondary punishment. In 1842, the penal colony was closed and the area was opened for free settlement. By 1850 the population of Brisbane had reached 8,000 and increasing numbers of pastoralists were grazing cattle and sheep in the Darling Downs west of the town. However, several attempts to establish settlements north of the Tropic of Capricorn had failed, and the settler population in the north remained small. Frontier violence between settlers and the Indigenous population became severe as pastoralism expanded north of the Tweed River.
A series of disputes between northern pastoralists and the government in Sydney led to increasing demands from the northern settlers for separation from New South Wales. In 1857, the British government agreed to the separation and in 1859 the colony of Queensland was proclaimed. The settler population of the new colony was 25,000 and the vast majority of its territory was still occupied by its traditional owners.

Convicts and colonial society

Convicts and emancipists 
Between 1788 and 1868, approximately 161,700 convicts (of whom 25,000 were women) were transported to the Australian colonies of New South Wales, Van Diemen's Land and Western Australia. Historian Lloyd Robson has estimated that perhaps two-thirds were thieves from working class towns, particularly from the Midlands and north of England. The majority were repeat offenders. The literacy rate of convicts was above average and they brought a range of useful skills to the new colony including building, farming, sailing, fishing and hunting. The small number of free settlers meant that early governors also had to rely on convicts and emancipists for professions such as lawyers, architects, surveyors and teachers.

The first governors saw New South Wales as a place of punishment and reform of convicts. Convicts worked on government farms and public works such as land clearing and building. After 1792 the majority were assigned to work for private employers including emancipists (as transported convicts who had completed their sentence or had been pardoned called themselves). Emancipists were granted small plots of land for farming and a year of government rations. Later they were assigned convict labour to help them work their farms. Some convicts were assigned to military officers to run their businesses because the officers did not want to be directly associated with trade. These convicts learnt commercial skills which could help them work for themselves when their sentence ended or they were granted a "ticket of leave" (a form of parole).

Convicts soon established a system of piece work which allowed them to work for wages once their allocated tasks were completed. Due to the shortage of labour, wage rates before 1815 were high for male workers although much lower for females engaged in domestic work. In 1814, Governor Macquarie ordered that convicts had to work until 3 p.m. after which private employers had to pay them wages for any additional work.

By 1821 convicts, emancipists and their children owned two-thirds of the land under cultivation, half the cattle and one-third of the sheep. They also worked in trades and small business. Emancipists employed about half of the convicts assigned to private masters.

After 1815 wages and employment opportunities for convicts and emancipists deteriorated as a sharp increase in the number of convicts transported led to an oversupply of labour. A series of reforms recommended by J. T. Bigge in 1822 and 1823 also sought to change the nature of the colony and make transportation "an object of real terror". The food ration for convicts was cut and their opportunities to work for wages restricted. More convicts were assigned to rural work gangs, bureaucratic control and surveillance of convicts was made more systematic, isolated penal settlements were established as places of secondary punishment, the rules for tickets of leave were tightened, and land grants were skewed to favour free settlers with large capital.  As a result, convicts who arrived after 1820 were far less likely to become property owners, to marry, and to establish families.

Free settlers 

The Bigge reforms also aimed to encourage affluent free settlers by offering them land grants for farming and grazing in proportion to their capital. From 1831 the colonies replaced land grants with land sales by auction at a fixed minimum price per acre, the proceeds being used to fund the assisted migration of workers. From 1821 to 1850 Australia attracted 200,000 immigrants from the United Kingdom. Although most immigrants settled in towns, many were attracted to the high wages and business opportunities available in rural areas. However, the system of land grants, and later land sales, led to the concentration of land in the hands of a small number of affluent settlers.

Two-thirds of the migrants to Australia during this period received assistance from the British or colonial governments. Healthy young workers without dependants were favoured for assisted migration, especially those with experience as agricultural labourers or domestic workers. Families of convicts were also offered free passage and about 3,500 migrants were selected under the English Poor Laws. Various special-purpose and charitable schemes,  such as those of Caroline Chisholm and John Dunmore Lang, also provided migration assistance.

Women
Colonial Australia was characterised by an imbalance of the sexes as women comprised only about 15 per cent of convicts transported. The first female convicts brought a range of skills including experience as domestic workers, dairy women and farm workers. Due to the shortage of women in the colony they were more likely to marry than men and tended to choose older, skilled men with property as husbands. The early colonial courts enforced the property rights of women independently of their husbands, and the ration system also gave women and their children some protection from abandonment. Women were active in business and agriculture from the early years of the colony, among the most successful being the former convict turned entrepreneur Mary Reibey and the agriculturalist Elizabeth Macarthur. One-third of the shareholders of the first colonial bank (founded in 1817) were women.

One of the goals of the assisted migration programs from the 1830s was to promote migration of women and families to provide a more even gender balance in the colonies. The philanthropist Caroline Chisholm established a shelter and labour exchange for migrant women in New South Wales in the 1840s and promoted the settlement of single and married women in rural areas where she hoped they would have a civilising influence on rough colonial manners and act as "God's police".

Between 1830 and 1850 the female proportion of the Australian settler population increased from 24 per cent to 41 per cent.

Religion 
The early chaplains of the colony were also civil magistrates with the power to discipline convicts and grant tickets of leave. The Church of England was the only recognised church before 1820 and its clergy worked closely with the governors. Richard Johnson, (chief chaplain 17881802) was charged by Governor Arthur Phillip, with improving "public morality" in the colony and was also heavily involved in health and education. Samuel Marsden (various ministries 17951838) became known for his missionary work, the severity of his punishments as a magistrate, and the vehemence of his public denunciations of Catholicism and Irish convicts.About a quarter of convicts were Catholics and they frequently requested a Catholic priest to perform their rites. The lack of official recognition of Catholicism was combined with suspicion of Irish convicts which only increased after the Irish-led Castle Hill Rebellion of 1804. Only two Catholic priests operated temporarily in the colony before Governor Macquarie appointed official Catholic chaplains in New South Wales and Van Diemen's Land in 1820.

The Bigge reports recommended that the status of the Anglican Church be enhanced as source of stability and moral authority in the colony. An Anglican archdeacon was appointed in 1824 and allocated a seat in the first advisory Legislative Council. The Anglican clergy and schools also received state support. This policy was changed under Governor Burke by the Church Acts of 1836 and 1837. The government now provided state support for the clergy and church buildings of the four largest denominations: Anglican, Catholic, Presbyterian and, later, Methodist.

The Church Acts did not alleviate sectarianism as many Anglicans saw state support of the Catholic Church as a threat. The prominent Presbyterian minister John Dunmore Lang also promoted sectarian divisions in the 1840s. State support, however, led to a growth in church activities. Charitable associations such as the Catholic Sisters of Charity, founded in 1838, provided hospitals, orphanages and asylums for the old and disabled. Religious organisations were also the main providers of school education in the first half of the nineteenth century, a notable example being Lang's Australian College which opened in 1831. Many religious associations, such as the Sisters of St Joseph, co-founded by Mary MacKillop in 1866, continued their educational activities after the provision of secular state schools grew from the 1850s.

Exploration of the continent

In 1798–99 George Bass and Matthew Flinders set out from Sydney in a sloop and circumnavigated Tasmania, thus proving it to be an island. In 1801–02 Matthew Flinders in  led the first circumnavigation of Australia. Aboard ship was the Aboriginal explorer Bungaree, of the Sydney district, who became the first person born on the Australian continent to circumnavigate the Australian continent.

In 1798, the former convict John Wilson and two companions crossed the Blue Mountains, west of Sydney, in an expedition ordered by Governor Hunter. Hunter suppressed news of the feat for fear that it would encourage convicts to abscond from the settlement. In 1813, Gregory Blaxland, William Lawson and William Wentworth crossed the mountains by a different route and a road was soon built to the Central Tablelands.

In 1824, the Governor Sir Thomas Brisbane, commissioned Hamilton Hume and former Royal Navy Captain William Hovell to lead an expedition to find new grazing land in the south of the colony, and also to find an answer to the mystery of where New South Wales' western rivers flowed. Over 16 weeks in 1824–25, Hume and Hovell journeyed to Port Phillip and back. They made many important discoveries including the Murray River (which they named the Hume), many of its tributaries, and good agricultural and grazing lands between Gunning, New South Wales and Corio Bay, Port Phillip.

Charles Sturt led an expedition along the Macquarie River in 1828 and discovered the Darling River. A theory had developed that the inland rivers of New South Wales were draining into an inland sea. Leading a second expedition in 1829, Sturt followed the Murrumbidgee River into a 'broad and noble river', which he named the Murray River. His party then followed this river to its junction with the Darling River. Sturt continued down river on to Lake Alexandrina, where the Murray meets the sea in South Australia.

Surveyor General Sir Thomas Mitchell conducted a series of expeditions from the 1830s to 'fill in the gaps' left by these previous expeditions. Mitchell employed three Aboriginal guides and was meticulous in recording the Aboriginal place names around the colony. He also recorded a violent encounter with traditional owners on the Murray in 1836 in which his men pursued them, "shooting as many as they could."

The Polish scientist and explorer Count Paul Edmund Strzelecki conducted surveying work in the Australian Alps in 1839 and, led by his two Aboriginal guides Charlie Tarra and Jackie, became the first European to ascend Australia's highest peak, which he named Mount Kosciuszko in honour of the Polish patriot Tadeusz Kościuszko.European explorers penetrated deeper into the interior in the 1840s in a quest to discover new lands for agriculture or answer scientific enquiries. The German scientist Ludwig Leichhardt led three expeditions in northern Australia in this decade, sometimes with the help of Aboriginal guides, identifying the grazing potential of the region and making important discoveries in the fields of botany and geology. He and his party disappeared in 1848 while attempting to cross the continent from east to west. Edmund Kennedy led an expedition into what is now far-western Queensland in 1847 before being speared by Aborigines in the Cape York Peninsula in 1848.

In 1860, Burke and Wills led the first south–north crossing of the continent from Melbourne to the Gulf of Carpentaria. Lacking bushcraft and unwilling to learn from the local Aboriginal people, Burke and Wills died in 1861, having returned from the Gulf to their rendezvous point at Coopers Creek only to discover the rest of their party had departed the location only a matter of hours previously. They became tragic heroes to the European settlers, their funeral attracting a crowd of more than 50,000 and their story inspiring numerous books, artworks, films and representations in popular culture.

In 1862, John McDouall Stuart succeeded in traversing Central Australia from south to north. His expedition mapped out the route which was later followed by the Australian Overland Telegraph Line.

The completion of the Overland Telegraph Line in 1872 was associated with further exploration of the Gibson Desert and the Nullarbor Plain. While exploring central Australia in 1872, Ernest Giles sighted Kata Tjuta from a location near Kings Canyon and called it Mount Olga. The following year Willian Gosse observed Uluru and named it Ayers Rock, in honour of the Chief Secretary of South Australia, Sir Henry Ayers.

In 1879, Alexander Forrest trekked from the north coast of Western Australia to the Overland Telegraph, discovering land suitable for grazing in the Kimberley region.

Impact of British settlement on Indigenous population
When the First Fleet arrived in Sydney Cove with some 1,300 colonists in January 1788 the Aboriginal population of the Sydney region is estimated to have been about 3,000 people. The first governor of New South Wales, Arthur Phillip, arrived with instructions to: "endeavour by every possible means to open an Intercourse with the Natives and to conciliate their affections, enjoining all Our Subjects to live in amity and kindness with them."

Disease 
The relative isolation of the Indigenous population for some 60,000 years meant that they had little resistance to many introduced diseases. An outbreak of smallpox in April 1789 killed about half the Aboriginal population of the Sydney region while only one death was recorded among the settlers. The source of the outbreak is controversial; some researchers contend that it originated from contact with Indonesian fisherman in the far north and spread along Aboriginal trade routes while others argue that it is more likely to have been deliberately spread by settlers. 

There were further smallpox outbreaks devastating Aboriginal populations from the late 1820s (affecting south-eastern Australia), in the early 1860s (travelling inland from the Coburg Peninsula in the north to the Great Australian Bight in the south), and in the late 1860s (from the Kimberley to Geraldton). According to Josphine Flood, the estimated Aboriginal mortality rate from smallpox was 60 per cent on first exposure, 50 per cent in the tropics, and 25 per cent in the arid interior. 

 

Other introduced diseases such as measles, influenza, typhoid and tuberculosis also resulted in high death rates in Aboriginal communities. Butlin estimates that the Aboriginal population in the area of modern Victoria was around 50,000 in 1788 before two smallpox outbreaks reduced it to about 12,500 in 1830. Between 1835 (the settlement of Port Phillip) and 1853, the Aboriginal population of Victoria fell from 10,000 to around 2,000. It is estimated that about 60 per cent of these deaths were from introduced diseases, 18 per cent from natural causes and 15 per cent from settler violence.

Venereal diseases were also a factor in Indigenous depopulation, reducing Aboriginal fertility rates in south-eastern Australia by an estimated 40 per cent by 1855. By 1890 up to 50 per cent of the Aboriginal population in some regions of Queensland were affected.

Conflict and dispossession 

The British settlement was initially planned to be a self-sufficient penal colony based on agriculture. Karskens argues that conflict broke out between the settlers and the traditional owners of the land because of the settlers' assumptions about the superiority of British civilisation and their entitlement to land which they had "improved" through building and cultivation.<ref>Karskens, Grace (2013). "The early colonial presence, 1788–1822". In Bashford, Alison; MacIntyre, Stuart (eds.). The Cambridge History of Australia, Volume 1, Indigenous and Colonial Australia. Cambridge: Cambridge University Press. p. 106. ISBN 9781107011533</bdi>.</ref>

Broome argues that the British claims of exclusive possession to land and other property was irreconcilable with Aboriginal concepts of communal ownership of land and its food resources. Flood points out that conflict between British law and Aboriginal customary law was also a source of conflict; for example, Aboriginal groups considered they had a right to hunt all animals on their traditional land whereas British settlers considered the killing of their livestock as poaching. Conflict also arose from cross-cultural misunderstandings and from reprisals for previous actions such as the kidnapping of Aboriginal men, women and children. Reprisal attacks and collective punishments were perpetrated by colonists and Aboriginal groups alike. Sustained Aboriginal attacks on settlers, the burning of crops and the mass killing of livestock were more obviously acts of resistance to the loss of traditional land and food resources.

As the colony spread to the more fertile lands around the Hawkesbury river, north-west of Sydney, conflict between the settlers and the Darug people intensified, reaching a peak from 1794 to 1810. Bands of Darug people, led by Pemulwuy and later by his son Tedbury, burned crops, killed livestock and raided settler huts and stores in a pattern of resistance that was to be repeated as the colonial frontier expanded. A military garrison was established on the Hawkesbury in 1795. The death toll from 1794 to 1800 was 26 settlers and up to 200 Darug.

Conflict again erupted from 1814 to 1816 with the expansion of the colony into Dharawal country in the Nepean region south-west of Sydney. Following the deaths of several settlers, Governor Macquarie despatched three military detachments into Dharawal lands, culminating in the Appin massacre (April 1816) in which at least 14 Aboriginal people were killed.

In the 1820s the colony spread to the lightly-wooded pastures west of the Great Dividing Range, opening the way for large scale farming and grazing in Wiradjuri country. From 1822 to 1824 Windradyne led a group of 50-100 Aboriginal men in raids on livestock and stockmen's huts resulting in the death of 15-20 colonists. Martial law was declared in August 1824 and ended five months later when Windradyne and 260 of his followers ended their armed resistance. Estimates of Aboriginal deaths in the conflict range from 15 to 100.

After two decades of sporadic violence between settlers and Aboriginal Tasmanians in Van Diemen's land, the Black War broke out in 1824, following a rapid expansion of settler numbers and sheep grazing in the island's interior. When Eumarrah, leader of the North Midlands people, was captured in 1828 he said his patriotic duty was to kill as many white people as possible because they had driven his people off their kangaroo hunting grounds. Martial law was declared in the settled districts of Van Diemen's Land in November 1828 and was extended to the entire island in October 1830. A "Black Line" of around 2,200 troops and settlers then swept the island with the intention of driving the Aboriginal population from the settled districts. From 1830 to 1834 George Augustus Robinson and Aboriginal ambassadors including Truganini led a series of "Friendly Missions" to the Aboriginal tribes which effectively ended the Black War.  Flood states that around 200 settler and 330 Aboriginal Tasmanian deaths in frontier violence were recorded during the period 1803 to 1834, but adds that it will never be known how many Aboriginal deaths went unreported. Clements estimates that colonists killed 600 Aboriginal people in eastern Van Diemen's Land during the Black War. Around 220 Aboriginal Tasmanians were eventually relocated to Flinders Island.As settlers and pastoralists spread into the region of modern Victoria in the 1830s, competition for land and natural resources again sparked conflict with traditional landowners. Aboriginal resistance was so intense that it was not unusual for sheep runs to be abandoned after repeated attacks. Broome estimates that 80 settlers and 1,000–1,500 Aboriginal people died in frontier conflict in Victoria from 1835 to 1853.

The growth of the Swan River Colony (centred on Fremantle and Perth) in the 1830s led to conflict with a number of clans of the Noongar people. Governor Sterling established a mounted police force in 1834 and in October that year he led a mixed force of soldiers, mounted police and civilians in a punitive expedition against the Pindjarup. The expedition culminated in the Pinjarra massacre in which some 15 to 30 Aboriginal people were killed. According to Neville Green, 30 settlers and 121 Aboriginal people died in violent conflict in Western Australia between 1826 and 1852.

The spread of sheep and cattle grazing in grasslands and semi-arid regions of Australia after 1850 brought further conflict with Aboriginal tribes more distant from the closely settled areas. Aboriginal casualty rates in conflicts increased as the colonists made greater use of mounted police, Native Police units, and newly developed revolvers and breech-loaded guns. Civilian colonists often launched punitive raids against Aboriginal groups without the knowledge of colonial authorities. Conflict was particularly intense in NSW in the 1840s and in Queensland from 1860 to 1880. In central Australia, it is estimated that 650 to 850 Aboriginal people, out of a population of 4,500, were killed by colonists from 1860 to 1895. In the Gulf Country of northern Australia five settlers and 300 Aboriginal people were killed before 1886. The last recorded massacre of Aboriginal people by settlers was at Coniston in the Northern Territory in 1928 where at least 31 Aboriginal people were killed.

The spread of British settlement also led to an increase in inter-tribal Aboriginal conflict as more people were forced off their traditional lands into the territory of other, often hostile, tribes. Butlin estimated that of the 8,000 Aboriginal deaths in Victoria from 1835 to 1855, 200 were from inter-tribal violence.

Broome estimates the total death toll from settler-Aboriginal conflict between 1788 and 1928 as 1,700 settlers and 17–20,000 Aboriginal people. Reynolds has suggested a higher "guesstimate" of 3,000 settlers and up to 30,000 Aboriginals killed. A project team at the University of Newcastle, Australia, has reached a preliminary estimate of 8,270 Aboriginal deaths in frontier massacres from 1788 to 1930.

Accommodation and protection 
In the first two years of settlement the Aboriginal people of Sydney, after initial curiosity, mostly avoided the newcomers. Governor Phillip had a number of Aboriginal people kidnapped in an attempt to learn their language and customs. One of these, Bennelong, led the survivors of several clans into Sydney in November 1790, 18 months after the smallpox epidemic that had devastated the Aboriginal population. Bungaree, a Kuringgai man, joined Matthew Flinders in his circumnavigation of Australia from 1801 to 1803, playing an important role as emissary to the various Indigenous peoples they encountered.
Governor Macquarie hoped to "effect the civilization of the Aborigines" and reclaim them "from their barbarous practices".  In 1815, he established a Native Institution to provide elementary education to Aboriginal children, settled 15 Aboriginal families on farms in Sydney and made the first freehold land grant to Aboriginal people at Black Town, west of Sydney. In 1816, he initiated an annual Native Feast at Parramatta which attracted Aboriginal people from as far as the Bathurst plains. However, by the 1820s the Native Institution and Aboriginal farms had failed. Aboriginal people continued to live on vacant waterfront land and on the fringes of the Sydney settlement, adapting traditional practices to the new semi-urban environment.

Escalating frontier conflict in the 1820s and 1830s saw colonial governments develop a number of policies aimed at protecting Aboriginal people. Protectors of Aborigines were appointed in South Australia and the Port Phillip District in 1839, and in Western Australia in 1840. While the aim was to extend the protection of British law to Aboriginal people, more often the result was an increase in their criminalisation. Protectors were also responsible for the distribution of rations, delivering elementary education to Aboriginal children, instruction in Christianity and training in occupations useful to the colonists. However, by 1857 the protection offices had been closed due to their cost and failure to meets their goals.Colonial governments established a small number of reserves and encouraged Christian missions which afforded some protection from frontier violence. In 1825, the NSW governor granted 10,000 acres for an Aboriginal mission at Lake Macquarie. In the 1830s and early 1840s there were also missions in the Wellington Valley, Port Phillip and Moreton Bay. The settlement for Aboriginal Tasmanians on Flinders Island operated effectively as a mission under George Robinson from 1835 to 1838.

In New South Wales, 116 Aboriginal reserves were established between 1860 and 1894. Most reserves allowed Aboriginal people a degree of autonomy and freedom to enter and leave. In contrast, the Victorian Board for the Protection of Aborigines (created in 1869) had extensive power to regulate the employment, education and place of residence of Aboriginal Victorians, and closely managed the five reserves and missions established since self government in 1858. In 1886, the protection board gained the power to exclude "half caste" Aboriginal people from missions and stations. The Victorian legislation was the forerunner of the racial segregation policies of other Australian governments from the 1890s.

In more densely settled areas, most Aboriginal people who had lost control of their land lived on reserves and missions, or on the fringes of cities and towns. In pastoral districts the British Waste Land Act of 1848 gave traditional landowners limited rights to live, hunt and gather food on Crown land under pastoral leases. Many Aboriginal groups camped on pastoral stations where Aboriginal men were often employed as shepherds and stockmen. These groups were able to retain a connection with their lands and maintain aspects of their traditional culture.

From autonomy to federation

Colonial self-government and the gold rushes

Towards representative government 
Imperial legislation in 1823 had provided for a Legislative Council nominated by the governor of New South Wales, and a new Supreme Court, providing additional limits to the power of governors. A number of prominent colonial figures, including William Wentworth. campaigned for a greater degree of self-government, although there were divisions about the extent to which a future legislative body should be popularly elected. Other major issues in the public debate about colonial self-government were traditional British political rights, land policy, transportation and whether colonies with a large population of convicts and former convicts could be trusted with self-government. The Australian Patriotic Association was formed in 1835 to promote representative government for New South Wales.The British government abolished transportation to New South Wales in 1840, and in 1842 granted limited representative government to the colony by establishing a reformed Legislative Council with one-third of its members appointed by the governor and two-thirds elected by male voters who met a property qualification. The property qualification meant that only 20 per cent of males were eligible to vote in the first Legislative Council elections in 1843.

The increasing immigration of free settlers, the declining number of convicts, and the growing middle class and working class population led to further agitation for liberal and democratic reforms. Public meetings in Adelaide in 1844 called for more representative government for South Australia. The Constitutional Association, formed in Sydney in 1848, called for manhood suffrage. The Anti-Transportation League, founded in Van Diemen's Land in 1849, also demanded more representative government. In the Port Phillip District, agitation for representative government was closely linked to demands for independence from New South Wales.

In 1850, the imperial parliament passed the Australian Colonies Government Act, granting Van Diemen's Land, South Australia and the newly-created colony of Victoria semi-elected Legislative Councils on the New South Wales model. The Act also reduced the property requirement for voting. Government officials were to be responsible to the governor rather than the Legislative Council, so the imperial legislation provided for limited representative government rather than responsible government.

The gold rushes of the 1850s 
Although gold had been found in Australia as early as 1823 by surveyor James McBrien, a gold rush began when Edward Hargraves widely publicised his discovery of gold near Bathurst, New South Wales, in February 1851. Further discoveries were made later that year in Victoria, where the richest gold fields were found. By British law all minerals belonged to the Crown, and the governors of New South Wales and Victoria quickly introduced laws aimed at avoiding the disorder associated with the California gold rush of 1848. Both colonies introduced a gold mining licence with a monthly fee, the revenue being used to offset the cost of providing infrastructure, administration and policing of the gold fields. As the size of allowable claims was small (6.1 metres square), and much of the gold was near the surface, the licensing system favoured small prospectors over large enterprises.

The gold rush initially caused some economic disruption including wage and price inflation and labour shortages as male workers moved to the goldfields. In 1852, the male population of South Australia fell by three per cent and that of Tasmania by 17 per cent. Immigrants from the United Kingdom, continental Europe, the United States and China also poured into Victoria and New South Wales. The Australian population increased from 430,000 in 1851 to 1,170,000 in 1861. Victoria became the most populous colony and Melbourne the largest city.

Chinese migration was a particular concern for colonial officials. There were 20,000 Chinese miners on the Victorian goldfields by 1855 and 13,000 on the New South Wales diggings. There was a widespread belief that they represented a danger to white Australian living standards and morality, and colonial governments responded by imposing a range of taxes, charges and restrictions on Chinese migrants and residents. Anti-Chinese riots erupted on the Victorian goldfields in 1856 and in New South Wales in 1860. According to Stuart Macintyre, "The goldfields were the migrant reception centres of the nineteenth century, the crucibles of nationalism and xenophobia[.]”

The Eureka stockade 
As more men moved to the gold fields and the quantity of easily-accessible gold diminished, the average income of miners fell. Victorian miners increasingly saw the flat monthly licence fee as a regressive tax and complained of official corruption, heavy-handed administration and the lack of voting rights for itinerant miners. Protests intensified in October 1854 when three miners were arrested following a riot at Ballarat. Protesters formed the Ballarat Reform League to support the arrested men and demanded manhood suffrage, reform of the mining licence and administration, and land reform to promote small farms. Further protests followed and protesters built a stockade on the Eureka Field at Ballarat. On 3 December troops overran the stockade, killing about 20 protesters. Five troops were killed and 12 seriously wounded.

Following a Royal Commission, the monthly licence was replaced with an annual miner's right at a lower cost which also gave holders the right to vote and build a dwelling on the gold fields. The administration of the Victorian goldfields was also reformed. Stuart Macintyre states, "The Eureka rebellion was a formative event in the national mythology, the Southern Cross [on the Eureka flag] a symbol of freedom and independence.” However, according to A. G. L. Shaw, the Eureka affair "is often painted as a great fight for Australian liberty and the rights of the working man, but it was not that. Its leaders were themselves small capitalists...and even after universal suffrage was introduced...only about a fifth of the miners bothered to vote."

Self-government and democracy 

Elections for the semi-representative Legislative Councils, held in New South Wales, Victoria, South Australia and Van Diemen's Land in 1851, produced a greater number of liberal members. That year, the New South Wales Legislative Council petitioned the British Government requesting self-government for the colony. The Anti-Transportation League also saw the convict system as a barrier to the achievement of self-government. In 1852, the British Government announced that convict transportation to Van Diemen's Land would cease and invited the eastern colonies to draft constitutions enabling responsible self-government. The Secretary of State cited the social and economic transformation of the colonies following the discoveries of gold as one of the factors making self-government feasible.

The constitutions for New South Wales, Victoria and Van Diemen's Land (renamed Tasmania in 1856) gained Royal Assent in 1855, that for South Australia in 1856. The constitutions varied, but each created a lower house elected on a broad male franchise and an upper house which was either appointed for life (New South Wales) or elected on a more restricted property franchise. Britain retained its right of veto over legislation regarding matters of imperial interest. When Queensland became a separate colony in 1859 it immediately became self-governing, adopting the constitution of New South Wales. Western Australia was granted self-government in 1890.

The secret ballot, adopted in Tasmania, Victoria and South Australia in 1856, followed by New South Wales (1858), Queensland (1859) and Western Australia (1877). South Australia introduced universal male suffrage for its lower house in 1856, followed by Victoria in 1857, New South Wales (1858), Queensland (1872), Western Australia (1893) and Tasmania (1900). Queensland excluded Aboriginal males from voting in 1885 (all women were also excluded).  In Western Australia, where all women were disenfranchised, a property qualification for voting existed for male Aboriginals, Asians, Africans and people of mixed descent.

Societies to promote women's suffrage were formed in Victoria in 1884, South Australia in 1888 and New South Wales in 1891. The Women's Christian Temperance Union also established branches in most Australian colonies in the 1880s, promoting votes for women and a range of social causes. Female suffrage, and the right to stand for office, was first won in South Australia in 1895. Women won the vote in Western Australia in 1900, with some restrictions based on race. Women in the remainder of Australia only won full rights to vote and to stand for elected office in the decade after Federation, although there were some racial restrictions.

The long boom (1860 to 1890)

Land reform 
In the 1860s New South Wales, Victoria, Queensland and South Australia introduced Selection Acts intended to promote family farms and mixed farming and grazing. Legislation typically allowed individual "selectors" to select small parcels of unused crown land or leased pastoral land for purchase on credit. The reforms initially had little impact on the concentration of land ownership as large landowners used loopholes in the laws to buy more land. However, refinements to the legislation, improvements in farming technology and the introduction of crops adapted to Australian conditions eventually led to the diversification of rural land use. The expansion of the railways from the 1860s allowed wheat to be cheaply transported in bulk, stimulating the development of a wheat belt from South Australia to Queensland. Land under cultivation increased from 200,000 hectares to 2 million hectares from 1850 to 1890.

Bushrangers
The period 1850 to 1880 saw a revival in bushranging. The first bushrangers had been escaped convicts or former convicts in the early years of British settlement who lived independently in the bush, often supporting themselves by criminal activity. The early association of the bush with freedom was the beginning of an enduring myth. The resurgence of bushranging from the 1850s drew on the grievances of the rural poor (several members of the Kelly gang, the most famous bushrangers, were the sons of impoverished small farmers). The exploits of Ned Kelly and his gang garnered considerable local community support and extensive national press coverage at the time. After Kelly's capture and execution for murder in 1880 his story inspired numerous works of art, literature and popular culture and continuing debate about the extent to which he was a rebel fighting social injustice and oppressive police, or a murderous criminal.

Economic growth and race 
From the 1850s to 1871 gold was Australia's largest export and allowed the colony to import a range of consumer and capital goods. More importantly, the increase in population in the decades following the gold rush stimulated demand for housing, consumer goods, services and urban infrastructure. By the 1880s half the Australian population lived in towns, making Australia more urbanised that the United Kingdom, the United States and Canada. Between 1870 and 1890 average income per person in Australia was more than 50 per cent higher than that of the United States, giving Australia one of the highest living standards in the world.

The size of the government sector almost doubled from 10 per cent of national expenditure in 1850 to 19 per cent in 1890. Colonial governments spent heavily on infrastructure such as railways, ports, telegraph, schools and urban services. Much of the money for this infrastructure was borrowed on the London financial markets, but land-rich governments also sold land to finance expenditure and keep taxes low.

In 1856, building workers in Sydney and Melbourne were the first in the world to win the eight hour working day. The 1880s saw trade unions grow and spread to lower skilled workers and also across colonial boundaries. By 1890 about 20 per cent of male workers belonged to a union, one of the highest rates in the world.

Economic growth was accompanied by expansion into northern Australia. Gold was discovered in northern Queensland in the 1860s and 1870s, and in the Kimberley and Pilbara regions of Western Australia in the 1880s. Sheep and cattle runs spread to northern Queensland and on to the Gulf Country of the Northern Territory and the Kimberley region of Western Australia in the 1870s and 1880s. Sugar plantations also expanded in northern Queensland during the same period.

The gold discoveries in northern Australia attracted a new wave of Chinese immigrants. The Queensland sugar cane industry also relied heavily on indentured South Sea Island workers, whose low wages and poor working conditions became a national controversy and led to government regulation of the industry. Additionally, a significant population of Japanese, Filipinos and Malays were working in pearling and fishing.  In 1890, the population of northern Australia is estimated at about 70,000 Europeans and 20,000 Asians and Pacific Islanders. Indigenous people probably outnumbered these groups, leaving white people a minority north of the Tropic of Capricorn.

From the late 1870s trade unions, Anti-Chinese Leagues and other community groups campaigned against Chinese immigration and low-wage Chinese labour. Following intercolonial conferences on the issue in 1880–81 and 1888, colonial governments responded with a series of laws which progressively restricted Chinese immigration and citizenship rights.

1890s depression 

Falling wool prices and the collapse of a speculative property bubble in Melbourne heralded the end of the long boom. When British banks cut back lending to Australia, the heavily indebted Australian economy fell into economic depression. A number of major banks suspended business and the economy contracted by 20 per cent from 1891 to 1895. Unemployment rose to almost a third of the workforce. The depression was followed by the "Federation Drought" from 1895 to 1903.

In 1890, a strike in the shipping industry spread to wharves, railways, mines and shearing sheds. Employers responded by locking out workers and employing non-union labour, and colonial governments intervened with police and troops. The strike failed, as did subsequent strikes of shearers in 1891 and 1894, and miners in 1892 and 1896. By 1896, the depression and employer resistance to trade unions saw union membership fall to only about five per cent of the workforce.

The defeat of the 1890 Maritime Strike led trade unions to form political parties. In New South Wales, the Labor Electoral League won a quarter of seats in the elections of 1891 and held the balance of power between the Free Trade Party and the Protectionist Party. Labor parties also won seats in the South Australian and Queensland elections of 1893. The world's first Labor government was formed in Queensland in 1899, but it lasted only a week.

From the mid-1890s colonial governments, often with Labor support, passed acts regulating wages, working conditions and "coloured" labour in a number of industries.

At an Intercolonial Conference in 1896, the colonies agreed to extend restrictions on Chinese immigration to "all coloured races". Labor supported the Reid government of New South Wales in passing the Coloured Races Restriction and Regulation Act, a forerunner of the White Australia Policy. However, after Britain and Japan voiced objections to the legislation, New South Wales, Tasmania and Western Australia instead introduced European language tests to restrict "undesirable" immigrants.

Growth of nationalism

By the late 1880s, a majority of people living in the Australian colonies were native born, although more than 90 per cent were of British and Irish heritage. The Australian Natives Association, a friendly society open to Australian-born males, flourished in the 1880s. It campaigned for an Australian federation within the British Empire, promoted Australian literature and history, and successfully lobbied for the 26 January to be Australia's national day.

Australian nationalists often claimed that unification of the colonies was Australia's destiny. Australians lived on a single continent, and the vast majority shared a British heritage and spoke English. Many nationalists spoke of Australians sharing common blood as members of the British "race". Henry Parkes stated in 1890, "The crimson thread of kinship runs through us all...we must unite as one great Australian people."

A minority of nationalists saw a distinctive Australian identity rather than shared "Britishness" as the basis for a unified Australia. Some, such as the radical magazine The Bulletin and the Tasmanian Attorney-General Andrew Inglis Clark, were republicans, while others were prepared to accept a fully independent country of Australia with only a ceremonial role for the British monarch. In 1887, poet Henry Lawson wrote of a choice between "The Old Dead Tree and the Young Tree Green/ The Land that belongs to the lord and the Queen,/And the land that belongs to you."

A unified Australia was usually associated with a white Australia. In 1887, The Bulletin declared that all white men who left the religious and class divisions of the old world behind were Australians. The 1880s and 1890s saw a proliferation of books and articles depicting Australia as a sparsely populated white nation threatened by populous Asian neighbours.  A white Australia also meant the exclusion of cheap Asian labour, an idea strongly promoted by the labour movement. According to historian John Hirst, "Federation was not needed to make the White Australia policy, but that policy was the most popular expression of the national ideal that inspired federation.”

The growing nationalist sentiment in the 1880s and 1890s was associated with the development of a distinctively Australian art and literature. Artists of the Heidelberg School such as Arthur Streeton, Frederick McCubbin and Tom Roberts followed the example of the European Impressionists by painting in the open air. They applied themselves to capturing the light and colour of the Australian landscape and exploring the distinctive and the universal in the "mixed life of the city and the characteristic life of the station and the bush".

In the 1890s Henry Lawson, Banjo Paterson and other writers associated with The Bulletin produced poetry and prose exploring the nature of bush life and themes of independence, stoicism, masculine labour, egalitarianism, anti-authoritarianism and mateship. Protagonists were often shearers, boundary riders and itinerant bush workers. In the following decade Lawson, Paterson and other writers such as Steele Rudd, Miles Franklin, and Joseph Furphy helped forge a distinctive national literature. Paterson's ballad "The Man from Snowy River" (1890) achieved popularity, and his lyrics to the song "Waltzing Matilda" (c. 1895) helped make it the unofficial national anthem for many Australians. According to Macintyre, however, even in the 1890s the "bush legend was just that, a myth that enshrined lost possibilities[.]"

Federation movement

Growing nationalist sentiment coincided with business concerns about the economic inefficiency of customs barriers between the colonies, the duplication of services by colonial governments and the lack of a single national market for goods and services. Colonial concerns about German and French ambitions in the region also led to British pressure for a federated Australian defence force and a unified, single-gauge railway network for defence purposes.

A Federal Council of Australasia was formed in 1885 but it had few powers and New South Wales and South Australia declined to join.

An obstacle to federation was the fear of the smaller colonies that they would be dominated by New South Wales and Victoria. Queensland, in particular, although generally favouring a white Australia policy, wished to maintain an exception for South Sea Islander workers in the sugar cane industry.

Another major barrier was the free trade policies of New South Wales which conflicted with the protectionist policies dominant in Victoria and most of the other colonies. Nevertheless, the NSW premier Henry Parkes was a strong advocate of federation and his Tenterfield Oration in 1889 was pivotal in gathering support for the cause. Parkes also struck a deal with Edmund Barton, leader of the NSW Protectionist Party, whereby they would work together for federation and leave the question of a protective tariff for a future Australian government to decide.

In 1890, representatives of the six colonies and New Zealand met in Melbourne and agreed in principle to a federation of the colonies and for the colonial legislatures to nominate representatives to attend a constitutional convention. The following year, the National Australasian Convention was held in Sydney, with all the future states and New Zealand represented. A draft constitutional Bill was adopted and transmitted to the colonial parliaments for approval by the people. The worsening economic depression and parliamentary opposition, however, delayed progress.

In early 1893 the first citizens' Federation League was established in the Riverina region of New South Wales and many other leagues were soon formed in the colonies. The leagues organised a conference in Corowa in July 1893 which developed a new plan for federation involving a constitutional convention with directly elected delegates and a referendum in each colony to endorse the proposed constitution. The new NSW premier, George Reid, endorsed the "Corowa plan" and in 1895 convinced the majority of other premiers to adopt it.

Most of the colonies sent directly elected representatives to the constitutional convention, although those of Western Australia were chosen by its parliament. Queensland did not send delegates. The convention held sessions in 1897 and 1898 which resulted in a proposed constitution for a Commonwealth of federated states under the British Crown.

Referendums held in 1898 resulted in solid majorities for the constitution in Victoria, South Australia and Tasmania. However, the referendum failed to gain the required majority in New South Wales after that colony's Labor Party campaigned against it and premier Reid gave it such qualified support that he earned the nickname "yes-no Reid".

The premiers of the other colonies agreed to a number of concessions to New South Wales (particularly that the future Commonwealth capital would be located in that state), and in 1899 further referendums were held in all the colonies except Western Australia. All resulted in yes votes.

In March 1900, delegates were dispatched to London, including Barton and the Victorian parliamentarian Alfred Deakin, who had been a leading advocate for federation. Following intense negotiations with the British government, the federation Bill was passed by the imperial government on 5 July 1900 and gained Royal Assent on 9 July. Western Australia subsequently voted to join the new federation.

Federation

White Australia, protectionism and rise of Labor 

The Commonwealth of Australia was proclaimed by the Governor-General, Lord Hopetoun on 1 January 1901, and Barton was sworn in as Australia's first prime minister. The first Federal elections were held in March 1901 and resulted in a narrow plurality for the Protectionist Party over the Free Trade Party with the Australian Labor Party (ALP) polling third. Labor declared it would support the party which offered concessions to its program, and Barton's Protectionists formed a government, with Deakin as Attorney-General.

The Immigration Restriction Act 1901 was one of the first laws passed by the new Australian parliament. This centrepiece of the White Australia policy aimed to extend the restrictions on the immigration of Asians that had previously been enacted by the colonies. Like the colonial legislation, the Immigration Restriction Act used a dictation test in a European language to exclude Asian migrants, who were considered a threat to Australia's living standards and majority British culture. The government also ended the use of indentured South Sea Islander labour in the Queensland sugar cane industry and announced that the workers would be repatriated to their islands by 1906. Deakin stated that White Australia, "is not a surface, but a reasoned policy which goes to the roots of national life, and by which the whole of our social, industrial and political organisation is governed."

In 1902, the government introduced female suffrage in the Commonwealth jurisdiction, but at the same time excluded Aboriginal people from the franchise unless they already had the vote in a state jurisdiction.

The Barton government also introduced a tariff on imports designed to raise revenue and protect Australian industry. However, the tariff was lower and less extensive than many protectionists wanted due to the need to attract sufficient support from Labor parliamentarians, who had a free vote on the issue and many of whom favoured free trade.

The three major parties all supported a system of Commonwealth conciliation and arbitration to settle industrial disputes extending across state borders, but Labor insisted that railway workers should be included in the system and preference be given to unionised labour. Disagreements about the legislation were instrumental in the fall of Deakin's Protectionist government in April 1904 and the appointment of the first national Labor government under prime minister Chris Watson. The Watson government itself fell in April and a Free Trade government under prime minister Reid successfully introduced legislation for a Commonwealth Conciliation and Arbitration Court.

In July 1905 Deakin withdrew his support for the Reid government and again formed a Protectionist government with the support of Labor. The new government embarked on a series of social reforms and a program dubbed "new protection" under which tariff protection for Australian industries would be linked to their provision of "fair and reasonable" wages. In the Harvester case of 1907, H. B. Higgins of the Conciliation and Arbitration Court set a fair and reasonable wage based on the needs of a male breadwinner supporting a wife and three children. In 1908, the High Court of Australia struck down the New Protection legislation as unconstitutional.  However, the Harvester case set a standard for a basic wage which was subsequently used by the Conciliation and Arbitration Court when settling industrial disputes. By 1914 the Commonwealth, New South Wales, Queensland and Western Australia used arbitration courts to settle industrial disputes and fix wages and conditions, while Victoria, South Australia and Tasmania used wage boards to achieve the same goals.

Labor and anti-Labor 
The base of the Labor Party was the Australian Trade Union movement which grew from under 100,000 members in 1901 to more than half a million in 1914. The party also drew considerable support from clerical workers, Catholics and small farmers. In 1905, the Labor party adopted objectives at the federal level which included the "cultivation of an Australian sentiment based upon the maintenance of racial purity" and "the collective ownership of monopolies". In the same year, the Queensland branch of the party adopted an overtly socialist objective.In 1906, the federal Free Trade Party changed its name to the Anti-Socialist party and in the December 1906 elections became the largest party with 38 per cent of the vote (compared with 37 per cent for Labor and 21 per cent for the Protectionists). Deakin's Protectionist government remained in power, but following the passage of legislation for old age pensions and a new protective tariff in 1908, Labor withdrew its support for the government and in November Andrew Fisher became the second Labor prime minister. In response, the Liberal-Protectionists, Anti-Socialists and conservative "Corner" group entered into a coalition known as the Fusion which formed a government under prime minister Deakin in June 1909. Reid stated that the question was whether Australia should follow a course of free enterprise or state control.

In the elections of May 1910, Labor won a majority in both houses of parliament and Fisher again became prime minister. The Labor government introduced a series of reforms including a progressive land tax (1910), invalid pensions (1910) and a maternity allowance (1912). The government established the Commonwealth Bank (1911) but referendums to nationalise monopolies and extend Commonwealth trade and commerce powers were defeated in 1911 and 1913. The Commonwealth took over responsibility for the Northern Territory from South Australia in 1911.

The anti-Labor parliamentary fusion was formalised as the Commonwealth Liberal Party under the former New South Wales Labor Party leader Joseph Cook. The Liberal Party narrowly won the May 1913 elections but Labor still controlled the Senate. The Cook government's attempt to pass legislation abolishing preferential treatment for union members in the Commonwealth Public Service triggered a double dissolution of parliament. Labor comfortably won the September 1914 elections and Fisher resumed office.

External affairs and defence 
With Federation, the Commonwealth inherited the small defence forces of the six former Australian colonies. By 1901, units of soldiers from all six Australian colonies had been active as part of British forces in the Boer War. When the British government asked for more troops from Australia in early 1902, the Australian government obliged with a national contingent. Some 16,500 men had volunteered for service by the war's end in June 1902.

In 1884, Britain and Germany had agreed to partition the eastern half of New Guinea. In 1902, British New Guinea was placed under the authority of Australia which saw the territory as vital for the protection of shipping lanes. With the passage of the Papua Act of 1905, British New Guinea became the Australian Territory of Papua. Formal Australian administration of the territory began in 1906.

Under a 1902 agreement, Australia contributed to the cost of a Royal Navy Pacific fleet to provide for the nation's defence, but Britain reserved the right to deploy the fleet outside Australian waters. Following Japan's defeat of Russia in the 1904–05 war, concern about Japanese naval power led to calls for an Australian fleet. Deakin proposed the purchase of destroyers in 1906 and his government's Surplus Revenue Act of 1908 provided £250,000 for naval expenditure. The Fisher Labor government increased the naval budget and in 1911 established the Royal Australian Navy. In October 1913, the navy's first battle cruiser, Australia, arrived in Sydney harbour, accompanied by the new light cruisers Sydney and Melbourne.

In 1907, Deakin proposed compulsory military training for home defence, a measure that was supported by Watson and Hughes of the Labor party. The Labor party adopted the measure at its 1908 annual conference and in 1911 the Fisher government expanded the system of compulsory military training which had been introduced by the Deakin government the previous year. Defence expenditure increased from £1 million in 1908–09 to £4.3 million in 1913–14, when it accounted for a third of the Commonwealth budget.

Economy and population 
The breaking of the Federation Drought in 1903 heralded a period of strong economic growth. The economy grew by 75 per cent in the fourteen years to the outbreak of the First World War, with pastoralism, construction, manufacturing and government services leading the way. Rural industries were still the major employer (accounting for a quarter of all jobs) but manufacturing was fast catching up. While employment grew by 30 per cent during the period, employment in manufacturing increased by almost 70 per cent.

The Australian population also grew strongly, driven by a fall in infant mortality, increasing adult life expectancy, and a revival in state-subsidised immigration. The population increased from four million in 1901 to five million in 1914. From 1910 to 1914 just under 300,000 migrants arrived, all white, and almost all from Britain.

First World War

Australia at war 191418 
When the United Kingdom declared war on Germany on 4 August 1914, the declaration automatically involved all of Britain's colonies and dominions. The outbreak of war came in the middle of the 1914 federal election campaign during which Labor leader Andrew Fisher promised to defend Britain "to the last man and the last shilling." Both major parties offered Britain 20,000 Australian troops. As the Defence Act 1903 precluded sending conscripts overseas, a new volunteer force, the Australian Imperial Force (AIF), was raised to meet this commitment.Public enthusiasm for the war was high, and the initial quota for the AIF was quickly filled. The troops left for Egypt on 1 November 1914, one of the escort ships, HMAS Sydney, sinking the German cruiser Emden along the way. Meanwhile, in September, a separate Australian expeditionary force had captured German New Guinea.

After arriving in Egypt, the AIF was incorporated into an Australian and New Zealand Army Corps (ANZAC) under the British general William Birdwood. The Anzacs formed part of the Mediterranean Expeditionary Force with the task of opening the Dardanelles to allied battleships, threatening Constantinople, the capital of the Ottoman Empire which had entered the war on the side of the Central Powers.The Anzacs, along with French, British and Indian troops, landed on the Gallipoli peninsula on 25 April 1915. The Australian and New Zealand position at Anzac Cove was vulnerable to attack and the troops suffered heavy losses in establishing a narrow beachhead. After it had become clear that the expeditionary force would be unable to achieve its objectives in the face of determined Turkish resistance, the Anzacs were evacuated in December, followed by the British and French in early January.

The Australians suffered about 8,000 deaths in the campaign. Australian war correspondents variously emphasised the bravery and fighting qualities of the Australians and the errors of their British commanders. By 1916,  Australian servicemen were commemorating 25 April, and the date soon became an Australian national holiday known as Anzac Day, centring on themes of "nationhood, brotherhood and sacrifice".

In 1916, five infantry divisions of the AIF were sent to the Western Front. In July 1916, at Fromelles, in a diversionary attack during the Battle of the Somme, the AIF suffered 5,533 casualties in 24 hours, the most costly single encounter in Australian military history. Elsewhere on the Somme, 23,000 Australians were killed or wounded in seven weeks of attacks on German positions. In Spring 1917, as the Germans retreated to the Hindenburg Line, pursuing Australian troops engaged them at the First Battle of Bullecourt and the Second Battle of Bullecourt, suffering 10,000 casualties. In the summer and autumn of 1917, Australian troops also sustained heavy losses during the British offensive around Ypres. Overall, almost 22,000 Australian troops were killed in 1917.

In November 1917 the five Australian divisions were united in the Australian Corps, and in May 1918 the Australian general John Monash took over command. The Australian Corps was heavily involved in halting the German Spring Offensive of 1918 and in the allied counter-offensive of August that year. Constituting about one tenth of the British and dominion soldiers on the Western Front, the Australian Corps was responsible for more than 20 per cent of the territory reconquered, prisoners captured and field guns taken in the counter offensive.

In the Middle East, the Australian Light Horse brigades were prominent in halting the Ottoman and German threat to the Suez Canal at Romani in August 1916. In 1917, they participated in the allied advance through the Sinai Peninsula and into Palestine. This included a light horse mounted charge at Beersheba in October which helped win the Third Battle of Gaza. In 1918, they pressed on through Palestine and into Syria in an advance that led to the Ottoman surrender on 31 October.

By the time the war ended on 11 November 1918, 324,000 Australians had served overseas. Casualties included 60,000 dead and 150,000 woundedthe highest casualty rate of any allied force. Australian troops also had higher rates of unauthorised absence, crime and imprisonment than other allied forces.

The home front 
Few Australians publicly opposed the war in 1914, and volunteers for the AIF outstripped the capacity to enlist and train them. There was also a surge in female participation in voluntary organisations such as the Red Cross and patriotic groups such as the One Woman, One Recruit League.  Anti-German leagues were formed and 7,000 Germans and other "enemy aliens" were sent to internment camps during the war.

In October 1914, the Fisher Labor government introduced the War Precautions Act which gave it the power to make regulations "for securing the public safety and defence of the Commonwealth". After Billy Hughes replaced Fisher as prime minister in October 1915, regulations under the act were increasingly used to censor publications, penalise public speech and suppress organisations that the government considered detrimental to the war effort.

Business uncertainty, the enlistment of young male workers, and the disruption of shipping and export markets led to a decline in economic output. The economy contracted by 10 per cent during the course of hostilities. Inflation rose in the first two years of war and real wages fell. Soon after becoming prime minister, Hughes abandoned a promised referendum to give the Commonwealth the power to control prices, although the government later used its wartime powers to regulate the prices of some basic goods. Lower wages and perceptions of profiteering by some businesses led, in 1916, to a wave of strikes by miners, waterside workers and shearers.

Enlistments also declined, falling from 35,000 a month at its peak in 1915 to 6,000 a month in 1916. Hughes returned from a trip to England and the Western Front in July 1916 and narrowly won a Cabinet vote to hold a referendum on conscription for overseas service. In September the New South Wales Labor Party expelled Hughes on account of the issue. Following the narrow defeat of the October 1916 conscription referendum, the state branches of the Labor party began expelling other prominent pro-conscriptionists. In November, Hughes and 23 of his supporters left the parliamentary party, and in January 1917 they formed a new Nationalist government with the former opposition. The Nationalists comfortably won the May 1917 elections and Hughes continued as prime minister.

Political and industrial unrest intensified in 1917. From August to October there was a major strike of New South Wales railway, transport, waterside and coal workers which was defeated after the Commonwealth and New South Wales governments arrested strike leaders and organised special constables and non-union labour. The Industrial Workers of the World (IWW) was declared an unlawful organisation and more than 100 of its members were arrested. In September, protests by the Women's Peace Army in Melbourne resulted in extensive damage to shops and offices.

Following further falls in enlistments in 1917, Hughes announced a second referendum on conscription to be held in December. The referendum campaign proved divisive, with Hughes denouncing opponents of the measure as "the Germans of Australia, the Sinn Féin and the IWW."  The Catholic Archbishop of Melbourne, Daniel Mannix, and the Labor premier of Queensland T. J. Ryan were prominent campaigners against conscription. The referendum was defeated by a wider margin than in 1916. An April 1918 recruiting conference including representatives of the Commonwealth government, State governments, employers and labour leaders also failed to reach agreement on measures to increase troop numbers. Enlistments in 1918 were the lowest for the war, leading to the disbandment of 12 battalions and mutinies in the AIF.

Paris peace conference 
Hughes attended the Imperial War Conference and Imperial War Cabinet in London from June 1918 where Australia, New Zealand, Canada and South Africa won British support for their separate representation at the eventual peace conference. At the Paris Peace Conference in 1919, Hughes argued that Germany should pay the full cost of the war, but ultimately gained only £5 million in war reparations for Australia. Australia and the other self-governing British dominions won the right to become full members of the new League of Nations, and Australia obtained a special League of Nations mandate over German New Guinea allowing Australia to control trade and immigration. Australia also gained a 42 per cent share of the formerly German-ruled island of Nauru, giving access to its rich superphosphate reserves. Australia argued successfully against a Japanese proposal for a racial equality clause in the League of Nations covenant, as Hughes feared that it would jeopardise the White Australia policy. As a signatory to the Treaty of Versailles and a full member of the League of Nations, Australia took an important step towards international recognition as a sovereign nation.

Inter-war years

1920s: men, money and markets

After the war, Prime Minister Billy Hughes led a new conservative force, the Nationalist Party, formed from the old Liberal party and breakaway elements of Labor (of which he was the most prominent), after the deep and bitter split over Conscription. An estimated 12,000 Australians died as a result of the Spanish flu pandemic of 1919, almost certainly brought home by returning soldiers.

The success of the Bolshevik Revolution in Russia posed a threat in the eyes of many Australians, although to a small group of socialists it was an inspiration. The Communist Party of Australia was formed in 1920 and, though remaining electorally insignificant, it obtained some influence in the trade union movement and was banned during World War II for its support for the Molotov–Ribbentrop Pact and the Menzies Government unsuccessfully tried to ban it again during the Korean War. Despite splits, the party remained active until its dissolution at the end of the Cold War.

The Country Party (today's National Party) formed in 1920 to promulgate its version of agrarianism, which it called "Countrymindedness". The goal was to enhance the status of the graziers (operators of big sheep ranches) and small farmers, and secure subsidies for them. Enduring longer than any other major party save the Labor party, it has generally operated in Coalition with the Liberal Party (since the 1940s), becoming a major party of government in Australia—particularly in Queensland.

Other significant after-effects of the war included ongoing industrial unrest, which included the 1923 Victorian Police strike. Industrial disputes characterised the 1920s in Australia. Other major strikes occurred on the waterfront, in the coalmining and timber industries in the late 1920s. The union movement had established the Australian Council of Trade Unions (ACTU) in 1927 in response to the Nationalist government's efforts to change working conditions and reduce the power of the unions.

The consumerism, entertainment culture, and new technologies that characterised the 1920s in the United States were also found in Australia. Prohibition was not implemented in Australia, though anti-alcohol forces were successful in having hotels closed after 6 pm, and closed altogether in a few city suburbs.

The fledgling film industry declined through the decade, despite more than 2 million Australians attending cinemas weekly at 1250 venues. A Royal Commission in 1927 failed to assist and the industry that had begun so brightly with the release of the world's first feature film, The Story of the Kelly Gang (1906), atrophied until its revival in the 1970s.

Stanley Bruce became Prime Minister in 1923, when members of the Nationalist Party Government voted to remove W.M. Hughes. Speaking in early 1925, Bruce summed up the priorities and optimism of many Australians, saying that "men, money and markets accurately defined the essential requirements of Australia" and that he was seeking such from Britain. The migration campaign of the 1920s, operated by the Development and Migration Commission, brought almost 300,000 Britons to Australia, although schemes to settle migrants and returned soldiers "on the land" were generally not a success. "The new irrigation areas in Western Australia and the Dawson Valley of Queensland proved disastrous"

In Australia, the costs of major investment had traditionally been met by state and Federal governments and heavy borrowing from overseas was made by the governments in the 1920s. A Loan Council was set up in 1928 to co-ordinate loans, three-quarters of which came from overseas. Despite Imperial Preference, a balance of trade was not successfully achieved with Britain. "In the five years from 1924. .. to ... 1928, Australia bought 43.4% of its imports from Britain and sold 38.7% of its exports. Wheat and wool made up more than two-thirds of all Australian exports", a dangerous reliance on just two export commodities.

Australia embraced the new technologies of transport and communication. Coastal sailing ships were finally abandoned in favour of steam, and improvements in rail and motor transport heralded dramatic changes in work and leisure. In 1918, there were 50,000 cars and lorries in the whole of Australia. By 1929 there were 500,000. The stage coach company Cobb and Co, established in 1853, finally closed in 1924. In 1920, the Queensland and Northern Territory Aerial Service (to become the Australian airline Qantas) was established. The Reverend John Flynn, founded the Royal Flying Doctor Service, the world's first air ambulance in 1928. Daredevil pilot, Sir Charles Kingsford Smith pushed the new flying machines to the limit, completing a round Australia circuit in 1927 and in 1928 traversed the Pacific Ocean, via Hawaii and Fiji from the US to Australia in the aircraft Southern Cross. He went on to global fame and a series of aviation records before vanishing on a night flight to Singapore in 1935.

Dominion status

Australia achieved independent Sovereign Nation status after World War I, under the Statute of Westminster. This formalised the Balfour Declaration of 1926, a report resulting from the 1926 Imperial Conference of British Empire leaders in London, which defined Dominions of the British empire in the following way: "They are autonomous Communities within the British Empire, equal in status, in no way subordinate one to another in any aspect of their domestic or external affairs, though united by a common allegiance to the Crown, and freely associated as members of the British Commonwealth of Nations."; however, Australia did not ratify the Statute of Westminster until 1942. According to historian Frank Crowley, this was because Australians had little interest in redefining their relationship with Britain until the crisis of World War II.

The Australia Act 1986 removed any remaining links between the British Parliament and the Australian states.

From 1 February 1927 until 12 June 1931, the Northern Territory was divided up as North Australia and Central Australia at latitude 20°S. New South Wales has had one further territory surrendered, namely Jervis Bay Territory comprising 6,677 hectares, in 1915. The external territories were added: Norfolk Island (1914); Ashmore Island, Cartier Islands (1931); the Australian Antarctic Territory transferred from Britain (1933); Heard Island, McDonald Islands, and Macquarie Island transferred to Australia from Britain (1947).

The Federal Capital Territory (FCT) was formed from New South Wales in 1911 to provide a location for the proposed new federal capital of Canberra (Melbourne was the seat of government from 1901 to 1927). The FCT was renamed the Australian Capital Territory (ACT) in 1938. The Northern Territory was transferred from the control of the South Australian government to the Commonwealth in 1911.

Great Depression

Australia was deeply affected by the Great Depression of the 1930s, particularly due to its heavy dependence on exports, especially primary products such as wool and wheat. Exposed by continuous borrowing to fund capital works in the 1920s, the Australian and state governments were "already far from secure in 1927, when most economic indicators took a turn for the worse. Australia's dependence of exports left her extraordinarily vulnerable to world market fluctuations", according to economic historian Geoff Spenceley. Debt by the state of New South Wales accounted for almost half of Australia's accumulated debt by December 1927. The situation caused alarm amongst a few politicians and economists, notably Edward Shann of the University of Western Australia, but most political, union and business leaders were reluctant to admit to serious problems. In 1926, Australian Finance magazine described loans as occurring with a "disconcerting frequency" unrivalled in the British Empire: "It may be a loan to pay off maturing loans or a loan to pay the interest on existing loans, or a loan to repay temporary loans from the bankers..." Thus, well before the Wall Street Crash of 1929, the Australian economy was already facing significant difficulties. As the economy slowed in 1927, so did manufacturing and the country slipped into recession as profits slumped and unemployment rose.

At elections held in October 1929, the Labor Party was swept into power in a landslide victory; Stanley Bruce, the former Prime Minister, lost his own seat. The new Prime Minister, James Scullin, and his largely inexperienced government were almost immediately faced with a series of crises. Hamstrung by their lack of control of the Senate, a lack of control of the banking system and divisions within their party about how best to deal with the situation, the government was forced to accept solutions that eventually split the party, as it had in 1917. Some gravitated to New South Wales Premier Lang, others to Prime Minister Scullin.

Various "plans" to resolve the crisis were suggested; Sir Otto Niemeyer, a representative of the English banks who visited in mid-1930, proposed a deflationary plan, involving cuts to government spending and wages. Treasurer Ted Theodore proposed a mildly inflationary plan, while the Labor Premier of New South Wales, Jack Lang, proposed a radical plan which repudiated overseas debt. The "Premier's Plan" finally accepted by federal and state governments in June 1931, followed the deflationary model advocated by Niemeyer and included a reduction of 20 per cent in government spending, a reduction in bank interest rates and an increase in taxation. In March 1931, Lang announced that interest due in London would not be paid and the Federal government stepped in to meet the debt. In May, the Government Savings Bank of New South Wales was forced to close. The Melbourne Premiers' Conference agreed to cut wages and pensions as part of a severe deflationary policy but Lang renounced the plan. The grand opening of the Sydney Harbour Bridge in 1932 provided little respite to the growing crisis straining the young federation. With multimillion-pound debts mounting, public demonstrations and move and counter-move by Lang and then Scullin, then Lyons federal governments, the Governor of New South Wales, Philip Game, had been examining Lang's instruction not to pay money into the Federal Treasury. Game judged it was illegal. Lang refused to withdraw his order and, on 13 May, he was dismissed by Governor Game. At June elections, Lang Labor's seats collapsed.

May 1931 had seen the creation of a new conservative political force, the United Australia Party formed by breakaway members of the Labor Party combining with the Nationalist Party. At Federal elections in December 1931, the United Australia Party, led by former Labor member Joseph Lyons, easily won office. They remained in power until September 1940. The Lyons government has often been credited with steering recovery from the depression, although just how much of this was owed to their policies remains contentious. Stuart Macintyre also points out that although Australian GDP grew from £386.9 million to £485.9 million between 1931 and 1932 and 1938–39, real domestic product per head of population was still "but a few shillings greater in 1938–39 (£70.12), than it had been in 1920–21 (£70.04)."

Australia recovered relatively quickly from the financial downturn of 1929–1930, with recovery beginning around 1932. The Prime Minister, Joseph Lyons, favoured the tough economic measures of the Premiers' Plan, pursued an orthodox fiscal policy and refused to accept the proposals of the Premier of New South Wales, Jack Lang, to default on overseas debt repayments. According to author Anne Henderson of the Sydney Institute, Lyons held a steadfast belief in "the need to balance budgets, lower costs to business and restore confidence" and the Lyons period gave Australia "stability and eventual growth" between the drama of the Depression and the outbreak of the Second World War. A lowering of wages was enforced and industry tariff protections maintained, which together with cheaper raw materials during the 1930s saw a shift from agriculture to manufacturing as the chief employer of the Australian economy—a shift which was consolidated by increased investment by the commonwealth government into defence and armaments manufacture. Lyons saw restoration of Australia's exports as the key to economic recovery.

The extent of unemployment in Australia, often cited as peaking at 29 per cent in 1932 is debated. "Trade union figures are the most often quoted, but the people who were there...regard the figures as wildly understating the extent of unemployment" wrote historian Wendy Lowenstein in her collection of oral histories of the depression; however, David Potts argued that "over the last thirty years ...historians of the period have either uncritically accepted that figure (29% in the peak year 1932) including rounding it up to 'a third', or they have passionately argued that a third is far too low." Potts himself though suggested a peak national figure of 25 per cent unemployed. Measurement is difficult in part because there was great variation, geographically, by age and by gender, in the level of unemployment. Statistics collected by historian Peter Spearritt show 17.8 per cent of men and 7.9 per cent of women unemployed in 1933 in the comfortable Sydney suburb of Woollahra. (This is not to say that 81.9 per cent of women were working but that 7.9 per cent of the women interested/looking for work were unable to find it, a much lower figure than maybe first thought, as many women stayed home and were not in the job force in those years, especially if they were unable to find work.)

In the working class suburb of Paddington, 41.3 per cent of men and 20.7 per cent of women were listed as unemployed. Geoffrey Spenceley stated that apart from variation between men and women, unemployment was also much higher in some industries, such as the building and construction industry, and comparatively low in the public administrative and professional sectors.
In country areas, worst hit were small farmers in the wheat belts as far afield as north-east Victoria and Western Australia, who saw more and more of their income absorbed by interest payments.

Extraordinary sporting successes did something to alleviate the spirits of Australians during the economic downturn. In a Sheffield Shield cricket match at the Sydney Cricket Ground in 1930, Don Bradman, a young New South Welshman of just 21 years of age wrote his name into the record books by smashing the previous highest batting score in first-class cricket with 452 runs not out in just 415 minutes. The rising star's world beating cricketing exploits were to provide Australians with much needed joy through the emerging Great Depression in Australia and post-World War II recovery. Between 1929 and 1931 the racehorse Phar Lap dominated Australia's racing industry, at one stage winning fourteen races in a row. Famous victories included the 1930 Melbourne Cup, following an assassination attempt and carrying 9 stone 12 pounds weight. Phar Lap sailed for the United States in 1931, going on to win North America's richest race, the Agua Caliente Handicap in 1932. Soon after, on the cusp of US success, Phar Lap developed suspicious symptoms and died. Theories swirled that the champion race horse had been poisoned and a devoted Australian public went into shock. The 1938 British Empire Games were held in Sydney from 5–12 February, timed to coincide with Sydney's sesqui-centenary (150 years since the foundation of British settlement in Australia).

Indigenous policy 
Following federation Aboriginal affairs was a state responsibility, although the Commonwealth became responsible for the Aboriginal population of the Northern Territory from 1911. By that date the Commonwealth and all states except Tasmania had passed legislation establishing Protectors of Aborigines and Protection Boards with extensive powers to regulate the lives of Aboriginal Australians including their ownership of property, place of residence, employment, sexual relationships and custody of their children. Reserves were established, ostensibly for the protection of the Aboriginal population who had been dispossessed of their land. Church groups also ran missions throughout Australia providing shelter, food, religious instruction and elementary schooling for Indigenous people.

Some officials were concerned by the growing number of Aboriginal children of mixed heritage, particularly in northern Australia where large Indigenous, South Sea Islander and Asian populations were seen as inconsistent with the white Australia policy. Laws concerning Aboriginal Australians were progressively tightened to make it easier for officials to remove Aboriginal children of mixed descent from their parents and place them in reserves, missions, institutions and employment with white employers.

The segregation of Aboriginal people on reserves and in institutions was never systematically accomplished due to funding constraints, differing policy priorities in the states and territories, and resistance from Aboriginal people. In the more densely settled areas of Australia, about 20 per cent of Aboriginal people lived on reserves in the 1920s. The majority lived in camps on the fringes of country towns and a small percentage lived in cities. During the Great Depression more Aboriginal people moved to reserves and missions for food and shelter. By 1941 almost half of the Aboriginal population of New South Wales lived on reserves.

In northern Australia, the majority of employed Aboriginal people worked in the pastoral industry where they lived in camps, often with their extended families. Many also camped on the margins of towns and reserves where they could avoid most of the controls imposed by the administrators of reserves, compounds and missions.

The 1937 Native Welfare conference of state and Commonwealth officials endorsed a policy of biological absorption of mixed-descent Aboriginal Australians into the white community.[T]he destiny of the natives of aboriginal origin, but not of the full blood, lies in their ultimate absorption by the people of the Commonwealth and it therefore recommends that all efforts be directed to that end.The officials saw the policy of Aboriginal assimilation by absorption into the white community as progressive, aimed at eventually achieving civil and economic equality for mixed-descent Aboriginal people."... efforts of all State authorities should be directed towards the education of children of mixed aboriginal blood at white standards, and their subsequent employment under the same conditions as whites with a view to their taking their place in the white community on an equal footing with the whites."The following decades saw an increase in the number of Aboriginal Australians of mixed descent removed from their families, although the states and territories progressively adopted a policy of cultural, rather than biological, assimilation, and justified removals on the grounds of child welfare. In 1940, New South Wales became the first state to introduce a child welfare model whereby Aboriginal children of mixed descent were removed from their families under general welfare provisions by court order. Other jurisdictions introduced a welfare model after the war.

Second World War

Defence policy in the 1930s

Until the late 1930s, defence was not a significant issue for Australians. At the 1937 elections, both political parties advocated increased defence spending, in the context of increased Japanese aggression in China and Germany's aggression in Europe; however, there was a difference in opinion about how the defence spending should be allocated. The United Australia Party government emphasised co-operation with Britain in "a policy of imperial defence". The lynchpin of this was the British naval base at Singapore and the Royal Navy battle fleet "which, it was hoped, would use it in time of need". Defence spending in the inter-war years reflected this priority. In the period 1921–1936 totalled £40 million on the Royal Australian Navy, £20 million on the Australian Army and £6 million on the Royal Australian Air Force (established in 1921, the "youngest" of the three services). In 1939, the Navy, which included two heavy cruisers and four light cruisers, was the service best equipped for war.

Fearing Japanese intentions in the Pacific, Menzies established independent embassies in Tokyo and Washington to receive independent advice about developments. Gavin Long argues that the Labor opposition urged greater national self-reliance through a buildup of manufacturing and more emphasis on the Army and RAAF, as Chief of the General Staff, John Lavarack also advocated. In November 1936, Labor leader John Curtin said "The dependence of Australia upon the competence, let alone the readiness, of British statesmen to send forces to our aid is too dangerous a hazard upon which to found Australia's defence policy." According to John Robertson, "some British leaders had also realised that their country could not fight Japan and Germany at the same time." But "this was never discussed candidly at...meeting(s) of Australian and British defence planners", such as the 1937 Imperial Conference.

By September 1939 the Australian Army numbered 3,000 regulars. A recruiting campaign in late 1938, led by Major-General Thomas Blamey increased the reserve militia to almost 80,000. The first division raised for war was designated the 6th Division, of the 2nd AIF, there being 5 Militia Divisions on paper and a 1st AIF in the First World War.

War

On 3 September 1939, the Prime Minister, Robert Menzies, made a national radio broadcast: "My fellow Australians. It is my melancholy duty to inform you, officially, that, in consequence of the persistence by Germany in her invasion of Poland, Great Britain has declared war upon her, and that, as a result, Australia is also at war."

Thus began Australia's involvement in the six-year global conflict. Australians were to fight in an extraordinary variety of locations, including withstanding the advance of German Panzers in the Siege of Tobruk, turning back the advance of the Imperial Japanese Army in the New Guinea Campaign, undertaking bomber missions over Europe, engaging in naval battles in the Mediterranean. At home, Japanese attacks included mini-submarine raids on Sydney Harbour and very heavy air raids on and near the Northern Territory's capital, Darwin.

The recruitment of a volunteer military force for service at home and abroad was announced, the 2nd Australian Imperial Force and a citizen militia organised for local defence. Troubled by Britain's failure to increase defences at Singapore, Menzies was cautious in committing troops to Europe. By the end of June 1940, France, Norway, Denmark and the Low Countries had fallen to Nazi Germany. Britain stood alone with its dominions. Menzies called for "all-out war", increasing federal powers and introducing conscription. Menzies' minority government came to rely on just two independents after the 1940 election.

In January 1941, Menzies flew to Britain to discuss the weakness of Singapore's defences. Arriving in London during The Blitz, Menzies was invited into Winston Churchill's British War Cabinet for the duration of his visit. Returning to Australia, with the threat of Japan imminent and with the Australian army suffering badly in the Greek and Crete campaigns, Menzies re-approached the Labor Party to form a War Cabinet. Unable to secure their support, and with an unworkable parliamentary majority, Menzies resigned as prime minister. The Coalition held office for another month, before the independents switched allegiance and John Curtin was sworn in as prime minister. Eight weeks later, Japan attacked Pearl Harbor.

From 1940 to 1941, Australian forces played prominent roles in the fighting in the Mediterranean theatre, including Operation Compass, the Siege of Tobruk, the Greek campaign, the Battle of Crete, the Syria–Lebanon Campaign and the Second Battle of El Alamein.

A garrison of around 14,000 Australian soldiers, commanded by Lieutenant General Leslie Morshead was besieged in Tobruk, Libya, by the German-Italian army of General Erwin Rommel between April and August 1941. The Nazi propagandist Lord Haw Haw derided the defenders as 'rats', a term the soldiers adopted as an ironic compliment: "The Rats of Tobruk". Vital in the defence of Egypt and the Suez Canal, the siege saw the advance of the German army halted for the first time and provided a morale boost for the British Commonwealth, which was then standing alone against Hitler.

The war came closer to home when  was lost with all hands in battle with the German raider Kormoran in November 1941.

With most of Australia's best forces committed to fight against Hitler in the Middle East, Japan attacked Pearl Harbor, the US naval base in Hawaii, on 8 December 1941 (eastern Australia time). The British battleship  and battlecruiser  sent to defend Singapore were sunk soon afterwards. Australia was ill-prepared for an attack, lacking armaments, modern fighter aircraft, heavy bombers, and aircraft carriers. While demanding reinforcements from Churchill, on 27 December 1941 Curtin published an historic announcement: "The Australian Government... regards the Pacific struggle as primarily one in which the United States and Australia must have the fullest say in the direction of the democracies' fighting plan. Without inhibitions of any kind, I make it clear that Australia looks to America, free of any pangs as to our traditional links or kinship with the United Kingdom."

British Malaya quickly collapsed, shocking the Australian nation. British, Indian and Australian troops made a disorganised last stand at Singapore, before surrendering on 15 February 1942. Around 15,000 Australian soldiers became prisoners of war. Curtin predicted that the "battle for Australia" would now follow. On 19 February, Darwin suffered a devastating air raid, the first time the Australian mainland had ever been attacked by enemy forces. For the following 19 months, Australia was attacked from the air almost 100 times.

Two battle-hardened Australian divisions were already steaming from the Middle East for Singapore. Churchill wanted them diverted to Burma, but Curtin refused, and anxiously awaited their return to Australia. US President Franklin D. Roosevelt ordered his commander in the Philippines, General Douglas MacArthur, to formulate a Pacific defence plan with Australia in March 1942. Curtin agreed to place Australian forces under the command of General MacArthur, who became "Supreme Commander of the South West Pacific". Curtin had thus presided over a fundamental shift in Australia's foreign policy. MacArthur moved his headquarters to Melbourne in March 1942 and American troops began massing in Australia. In late May 1942, Japanese midget submarines sank an accommodation vessel in a daring raid on Sydney Harbour. On 8 June 1942, two Japanese submarines briefly shelled Sydney's eastern suburbs and the city of Newcastle.

In an effort to isolate Australia, the Japanese planned a seaborne invasion of Port Moresby, in the Australian Territory of New Guinea. In May 1942, the US Navy engaged the Japanese in the Battle of the Coral Sea and halted the attack. The Battle of Midway in June effectively defeated the Japanese navy and the Japanese army launched a land assault on Moresby from the north. Between July and November 1942, Australian forces repulsed Japanese attempts on the city by way of the Kokoda Track, in the highlands of New Guinea. The Battle of Milne Bay in August 1942 was the first Allied defeat of Japanese land forces.

Meanwhile, in North Africa, the Axis Powers had driven Allies back into Egypt. A turning point came between July and November 1942, when Australia's 9th Division played a crucial role in some of the heaviest fighting of the First and Second Battle of El Alamein, which turned the North Africa Campaign in favour of the Allies.

The Battle of Buna–Gona, between November 1942 and January 1943, set the tone for the bitter final stages of the New Guinea campaign, which persisted into 1945. The offensives in Papua and New Guinea of 1943–44 were the single largest series of connected operations ever mounted by the Australian armed forces. On 14 May 1943, the Australian Hospital Ship Centaur, though clearly marked as a medical vessel, was sunk by Japanese raiders off the Queensland coast, killing 268, including all but one of the nursing staff, further enraging popular opinion against Japan.

Australian prisoners of war were at this time suffering severe ill-treatment in the Pacific Theatre. In 1943, 2,815 Australian Pows died constructing Japan's Burma-Thailand Railway In 1944, the Japanese inflicted the Sandakan Death March on 2,000 Australian and British prisoners of war—only 6 survived. This was the single worst war crime perpetrated against Australians in war.

MacArthur largely excluded Australian forces from the main push north into the Philippines and Japan. It was left to Australia to lead amphibious assaults against Japanese bases in Borneo. Curtin suffered from ill health from the strains of office and died weeks before the war ended, replaced by Ben Chifley.

Of Australia's wartime population of seven million, almost one million men and women served in a branch of the services during the six years of warfare. By war's end, gross enlistments totalled 727,200 men and women in the Australian Army (of whom 557,800 served overseas), 216,900 in the RAAF and 48,900 in the RAN. More than 39,700 were killed or died as prisoners of war, about 8,000 of whom died as prisoners of the Japanese.

Australian home front

While the Australian civilian population suffered less at the hands of the Axis powers than did other Allied nations in Asia and Europe, Australia nevertheless came under direct attack by Japanese naval forces and aerial bombardments, particularly through 1942 and 1943, resulting in hundreds of fatalities and fuelling fear of Japanese invasion. Axis naval activity in Australian waters also brought the war close to home for Australians. Austerity measures, rationing and labour controls measures were all implemented to assist the war effort. Australian civilians dug air raid shelters, trained in civil defence and first aid, and Australian ports and cities were equipped with anti aircraft and sea defences.

The Australian economy was markedly affected by World War II. Expenditure on war reached 37 per cent of GDP by 1943–44, compared to 4 per cent expenditure in 1939–1940. Total war expenditure was £2,949 million between 1939 and 1945.

Although the peak of army enlistments occurred in June–July 1940, when more than 70,000 enlisted, it was the Curtin Labor Government, formed in October 1941, that was largely responsible for "a complete revision of the whole Australian economic, domestic and industrial life". Rationing of fuel, clothing and some food was introduced, (although less severely than in Britain) Christmas holidays curtailed, "brown outs" introduced and some public transport reduced. From December 1941, the Government evacuated all women and children from Darwin and northern Australia, and more than 10,000 refugees arrived from South East Asia as Japan advanced. In January 1942, the Manpower Directorate was set up "to ensure the organisation of Australians in the best possible way to meet all defence requirements." Minister for War Organisation of Industry, John Dedman introduced a degree of austerity and government control previously unknown, to such an extent that he was nicknamed "the man who killed Father Christmas".

In May 1942 uniform tax laws were introduced in Australia, ending state governments' control of income taxation. "The significance of this decision was greater than any other... made throughout the war, as it added extensive powers to the Federal Government and greatly reduced the financial autonomy of the states."

Manufacturing grew significantly because of the war. "In 1939, there were only three Australian firms producing machine tools, but by 1943 there were more than one hundred doing so." From having few front line aircraft in 1939, the RAAF had become the fourth largest allied Air force by 1945. A number of aircraft were built under licence in Australia before the war's end, notably the Beaufort and Beaufighter, although the majority of aircraft were from Britain and later, the US. The Boomerang fighter, designed and built in four months of 1942, emphasised the desperate state Australia found itself in as the Japanese advanced.

Australia also created, virtually from nothing, a significant female workforce engaged in direct war production. Between 1939 and 1944 the number of women working in factories rose from 171,000 to 286,000. Dame Enid Lyons, widow of former Prime Minister Joseph Lyons, became the first woman elected to the House of Representatives in 1943, joining the Robert Menzies' new centre-right Liberal Party of Australia, formed in 1945. At the same election, Dorothy Tangney became the first woman elected to the Senate.

Post-war boom

Menzies and Liberal dominance: 1949–72

Politically, Robert Menzies and the Liberal Party of Australia dominated much of the immediate post war era, defeating the Labor government of Ben Chifley in 1949, in part because of a Labor proposal to nationalise banks and following a crippling coal strike led by the Australian Communist Party. Menzies became the country's longest-serving Prime Minister and the Liberal party, in coalition with the rural based Country Party, won every federal election until 1972.

As in the United States in the early 1950s, allegations of communist influence in society saw tensions emerge in politics. Refugees from Soviet dominated Eastern Europe immigrated to Australia, while to Australia's north, Mao Zedong's Chinese Communist Party won the Chinese Civil War in 1949 and in June 1950, Communist North Korea invaded South Korea. The Menzies government responded to a United States led United Nations Security Council request for military aid for South Korea and diverted forces from occupied Japan to begin Australia's involvement in the Korean War. After fighting to a bitter standstill, the UN and North Korea signed a ceasefire agreement in July 1953. Australian forces had participated in such major battles as Kapyong and Maryang San. 17,000 Australians had served and casualties amounted to more than 1,500, of whom 339 were killed.

During the course of the Korean War, the Liberal Government attempted to ban the Communist Party of Australia, first by legislation in 1950 and later by referendum, in 1951. While both attempts were unsuccessful, further international events such as the defection of minor Soviet Embassy official Vladimir Petrov, added to a sense of impending threat that politically favoured Menzies' Liberal-CP government, as the Labor Party split over concerns about the influence of the Communist Party on the trade union movement. The tensions led to another bitter split and the emergence of the breakaway Democratic Labor Party (DLP). The DLP remained an influential political force, often holding the balance of power in the Senate, until 1974. Its preferences supported the Liberal and Country Party. The Labor party was led by H.V. Evatt after Chifley's death in 1951. Evatt had served as President of the United Nations General Assembly during 1948–49 and helped draft the United Nations Universal Declaration of Human Rights (1948). Evatt retired in 1960 amid signs of mental ill-health, and Arthur Calwell succeeded him as leader, with a young Gough Whitlam as his deputy.

Menzies presided during a period of sustained economic boom and the beginnings of sweeping social change, which included youth culture and its rock and roll music and, in the late 1950s, the arrival of television broadcasting. In 1958, Australian country music singer Slim Dusty, who would become the musical embodiment of rural Australia, had Australia's first international music chart hit with his bush ballad "Pub With No Beer", while rock and roller Johnny O'Keefe's "Wild One" became the first local recording to reach the national charts, peaking at No. 20. Australian cinema produced little of its own content in the 1950s, but British and Hollywood studios produced a string of successful epics from Australian literature, featuring home grown stars Chips Rafferty and Peter Finch.

Menzies remained a staunch supporter of links to the monarchy and Commonwealth of Nations and formalised an alliance with the United States, but also launched post-war trade with Japan, beginning a growth of Australian exports of coal, iron ore and mineral resources that would steadily climb until Japan became Australia's largest trading partner.

When Menzies retired in 1965, he was replaced as Liberal leader and Prime Minister by Harold Holt. Holt drowned while swimming at a surf beach in December 1967 and was replaced by John Gorton (1968–1971) and then by William McMahon (1971–1972).

Post-war immigration

Following World War II, the Chifley Labor government instigated a massive programme of European immigration. In 1945, Minister for Immigration, Arthur Calwell wrote "If the experience of the Pacific War has taught us one thing, it surely is that seven million Australians cannot hold three million square miles of this earth's surface indefinitely." All political parties shared the view that the country must "populate or perish". Calwell stated a preference for ten British immigrants for each one from other countries; however, the numbers of British migrants fell short of what was expected, despite government assistance.

Migration brought large numbers of southern and central Europeans to Australia for the first time. A 1958 government leaflet assured readers that unskilled non-British migrants were needed for "labour on rugged projects ... work which is not generally acceptable to Australians or British workers". The Australian economy stood in sharp contrast to war-ravaged Europe, and newly arrived migrants found employment in a booming manufacturing industry and government assisted programmes such as the Snowy Mountains Scheme. This hydroelectricity and irrigation complex in south-east Australia consisted of sixteen major dams and seven power stations constructed between 1949 and 1974. It remains the largest engineering project undertaken in Australia. Necessitating the employment of 100,000 people from more than 30 countries, to many it denoted the birth of multicultural Australia.
Some 4.2 million immigrants arrived between 1945 and 1985, about 40 per cent of whom came from Britain and Ireland. The 1957 novel They're a Weird Mob was a popular account of an Italian migrating to Australia, although written by Australian-born author John O'Grady. The Australian population reached 10 million in 1959–with Sydney its most populous city.

In May 1958, the Menzies Government passed the Migration Act 1958 which replaced the Immigration Restriction Act's arbitrarily applied dictation test with an entry permit system, that reflected economic and skills criteria. Further changes in the 1960s effectively ended the White Australia Policy. It legally ended in 1973.

Economic growth and suburban living

Australia enjoyed significant growth in prosperity in the 1950s and 1960s, with increases in both living standards and in leisure time. The manufacturing industry, previously playing a minor part in an economy dominated by primary production, greatly expanded. The first Holden motor car came out of General Motors-Holden's Fisherman's Bend factory in November 1948. Car ownership rapidly increased—from 130 owners in every 1,000 in 1949 to 271 owners in every 1,000 by 1961. By the early 1960s, four competitors to Holden had set up Australian factories, employing between 80,000 and 100,000 workers, "at least four-fifths of them migrants".

In the 1960s, about 60 per cent of Australian manufacturing was protected by tariffs. Pressure from business interests and the union movement ensured these remained high. Historian Geoffrey Bolton suggests that this high tariff protection of the 1960s caused some industries to "lapse into lethargy", neglecting research and development and the search for new markets. The CSIRO was expected to fulfil research and development.

Prices for wool and wheat remained high, with wool the mainstay of Australia's exports. Sheep numbers grew from 113 million in 1950 to 171 million in 1965. Wool production increased from 518,000 to 819,000 tonnes in the same period. Wheat, wool and minerals ensured a healthy balance of trade between 1950 and 1966.

The great housing boom of the post war period saw rapid growth in the suburbs of the major Australian cities. By the 1966 census, only 14 per cent lived in rural Australia, down from 31 per cent in 1933, and only 8 per cent lived on farms. Virtual full employment meant high standards of living and dramatic increases in home ownership, and by the sixties, Australia had the most equitable spread of income in the world. By the beginning of the sixties, an Australia-wide McNair survey estimated that 94% of homes had a fridge, 50% a telephone, 55% a television, 60% a washing machine, and 73% a vacuum cleaner. In addition, most households had now acquired a car. According to one study, "In 1946, there was one car for every 14 Australians; by 1960, it was one to 3.5. The vast majority of families had access to a car."

Car ownership flourished during the postwar period, with 1970/1971 census data estimating that 96.4 per cent of Australian households in the early Seventies owned at least one car; however, not all felt the rapid suburban growth was desirable. Distinguished Architect and designer Robin Boyd, a critic of Australia's built surroundings, described Australia as "'the constant sponge lying in the Pacific', following the fashions of overseas and lacking confidence in home-produced, original ideas". In 1956, dadaist comedian Barry Humphries performed the character of Edna Everage as a parody of a house-proud housewife of staid 1950s Melbourne suburbia (the character only later morphed into a critique of self-obsessed celebrity culture). It was the first of many of his satirical stage and screen creations based around quirky Australian characters: Sandy Stone, a morose elderly suburbanite, Barry McKenzie a naive Australian expat in London and Sir Les Patterson, a vulgar parody of a Whitlam-era politician.

Some writers defended suburban life. Journalist Craig Macgregor saw suburban life as a "...solution to the needs of migrants..." Hugh Stretton argued that "plenty of dreary lives are indeed lived in the suburbs... but most of them might well be worse in other surroundings". Historian Peter Cuffley has recalled life for a child in a new outer suburb of Melbourne as having a kind of joyous excitement. "Our imaginations saved us from finding life too humdrum, as did the wild freedom of being able to roam far and wide in different kinds of (neighbouring) bushland...Children in the suburbs found space in backyards, streets and lanes, playgrounds and reserves..."

In 1954, the Menzies Government formally announced the introduction of the new two-tiered TV system—a government-funded service run by the ABC, and two commercial services in Sydney and Melbourne, with the 1956 Summer Olympics in Melbourne being a major driving force behind the introduction of television to Australia. Colour TV began broadcasting in 1975.

Indigenous assimilation and child removal 
The 1951 Native Welfare Conference of state and Commonwealth officials agreed on a policy of cultural assimilation for all Aboriginal Australians. Paul Hasluck, the Commonwealth Minister for Territories, stated: "Assimilation means, in practical terms, that, in the course of time, it is expected that all persons of aboriginal blood or mixed blood in Australia will live like other white Australians do."

Controls over the daily lives of Aboriginal people and the removal of Aboriginal children of mixed descent continued under the policy of assimilation, although the control was now largely exercised by Welfare Boards and removals were justified on welfare grounds. The number of Aboriginal people deemed to be wards of the state under Northern Territory welfare laws doubled to 11,000 from 1950 to 1965.

The policy of assimilation attracted increasing criticism from Aboriginal people and their supporters on the grounds of its negative effects on Aboriginal families and its denial of Aboriginal cultural autonomy. Removals of Aboriginal children of mixed descent from their families slowed by the late 1960s and by 1973 the Commonwealth had adopted a policy of self-determination for Indigenous Australians.

In 1997, the Human Rights and Equal Opportunity Commission estimated that between 10 per cent and one-third of Aboriginal children had been removed from their families from 1910 to 1970. Regional studies indicate that 15 per cent of Aboriginal children were removed in New South Wales from 1899 to 1968, while the figure for Victoria was about 10 per cent. Robert Manne estimates that the figure for Australia as a whole was closer to 10 per cent.

Summarising the policy of assimilation and forced removals of Aboriginal children of mixed descent, Richard Broome concludes: "Even though the children's material conditions and Western education may have been improved by removal, even though some removals were necessary, and even though some people were thankful for it in retrospect, overall it was a disaster....It was a rupturing of tens of thousands of Aboriginal families, aimed at eradicating Aboriginality from the nation in the cause of homogeneity and in fear of difference."

Alliances 1950–1972

In the early 1950s, the Menzies government saw Australia as part of a "triple alliance" in concert with both the US and traditional ally Britain. At first, "the Australian leadership opted for a consistently pro-British line in diplomacy", while at the same time looking for opportunities to involve the US in South East Asia. Thus, the government committed military forces to the Korean War and the Malayan Emergency and hosted British nuclear tests after 1952. Australia was also the only Commonwealth country to offer support to the British during the Suez Crisis.

Menzies oversaw an effusive welcome to Queen Elizabeth II on the first visit to Australia by a reigning monarch, in 1954. He made the following remarks during a light-hearted speech to an American audience in New York, while on his way to attend her coronation in 1953: "We in Australia, of course, are British, if I may say so, to the boot heels...but we stand together – our people stand together – till the crack of doom."

As British influence declined in South East Asia, the US alliance came to have greater significance for Australian leaders and the Australian economy. British investment in Australia remained significant until the late 1970s, but trade with Britain declined through the 1950s and 1960s. In the late 1950s the Australian Army began to re-equip using US military equipment. In 1962, the US established a naval communications station at North West Cape, the first of several built during the next decade. Most significantly, in 1962, Australian Army advisors were sent to help train South Vietnamese forces, in a developing conflict in which the British had no part.

According to diplomat Alan Renouf, the dominant theme in Australia's foreign policy under Australia's Liberal–Country Party governments of the 1950s and 1960s was anti-communism. Another former diplomat, Gregory Clark, suggested that it was specifically a fear of China that drove Australian foreign policy decisions for twenty years. The ANZUS security treaty, which had been signed in 1951, had its origins in Australia's and New Zealand's fears of a rearmed Japan. Its obligations on the US, Australia and New Zealand are vague, but its influence on Australian foreign policy thinking, at times has been significant. The SEATO treaty, signed only three years later, clearly demonstrated Australia's position as a US ally in the emerging Cold War.

As Britain struggled to enter the Common Market in the 1960s, Australia saw that its historic ties with the mother country were rapidly fraying. Canberra was alarmed but kept a low profile, not wanting to alienate London. Russel Ward states that the implications of British entry into Europe in 1973: "seemed shattering to most Australians, particularly to older people and conservatives." Carl Bridge, however, points out that Australia had been "hedging its British bets" for some time. The ANZUS treaty and Australia's decision to enter the Vietnam War did not involve Britain and by 1967 Japan was Australia's leading export partner and the US her largest source of imports. According to Bridge, Australia's decision not to follow Britain's devaluation of her currency in 1967 "marked the demise of British Australia."

Vietnam War

By 1965, Australia had increased the size of the Australian Army Training Team Vietnam (AATTV), and in April the Government made a sudden announcement that "after close consultation with the United States", a battalion of troops was to be sent to South Vietnam. In parliament, Menzies emphasised the argument that "our alliances made demands on us". The alliance involved was presumably, the Southeast Asia Treaty Organization (SEATO), and Australia was providing military assistance because South Vietnam, a signatory to SEATO, had apparently requested it. Documents released in 1971 indicated that the decision to commit troops was made by Australia and the US, not at the request of South Vietnam. By 1968, there were three Australian Army battalions at any one time at the 1st Australian Task Force (1ATF) base at Nui Dat in addition to the advisers of the AATTV placed throughout Vietnam, and personnel reached a peak total of almost 8,000, comprising about one third of the Army's combat capacity. Between 1962 and 1972 almost 60,000 personnel served in Vietnam, including ground troops, naval forces and air assets.

In July 1966, new Prime Minister Harold Holt expressed his government's support for the US and its role in Vietnam in particular. "I don't know where people would choose to look for the security of this country were it not for the friendship and strength of the United States." While on a visit in the same year to the US, Holt assured President Lyndon B. Johnson "...I hope there is corner of your mind and heart which takes cheer from the fact that you have an admiring friend, a staunch friend, [Australia] that will be all the way with LBJ."

The Liberal-CP Government was returned with a massive majority in elections held in December 1966, fought over national security issues including Vietnam. The opposition Labor Party had advocated the withdrawal of all conscripts from Vietnam, but its deputy leader Gough Whitlam had stated that a Labor government might maintain regular army troops there. Arthur Calwell, who had been leader of the Labor Party since 1960, retired in favour of Whitlam a few months later.

Despite Holt's sentiments and his government's electoral success in 1966, the war became unpopular in Australia, as it did in the United States. The movements to end Australia's involvement gathered strength after the Tet Offensive of early 1968 and compulsory national service (selected by ballot) became increasingly unpopular. In the 1969 elections, the government hung on despite a significant decline in popularity. Moratorium marches held across Australia in mid-1970 attracted large crowds- the Melbourne march of 100,000 being led by Labor MP Jim Cairns. As the Nixon administration proceeded with Vietnamization of the war and began the withdrawal of troops, so did the Australian Government. In November 1970 1st Australian Task Force was reduced to two battalions and in November 1971, 1ATF was withdrawn from Vietnam. The last military advisors of the AATTV were withdrawn by the Whitlam Labor Government in mid-December 1972.

The Australian military presence in Vietnam had lasted 10 years, and in purely human cost, more than 500 had been killed and more than 2,000 wounded. The war cost Australia $218 million between 1962 and 1972.

Reform and reaction: 1972–1996

The Whitlam Government: 1972–75

Elected in December 1972 after 23 years in opposition, Labor won office under Gough Whitlam, introducing significant reforms and expanding the Federal budget. Welfare benefits were extended and payment rates increased, a national health insurance scheme was introduced, and divorce laws liberalised. Commonwealth expenditure on schools trebled in the two years to mid-1975 and the Commonwealth assumed responsibility for funding higher education, abolishing tuition fees. In foreign affairs the new government prioritised the Asia Pacific region, formally abolishing the White Australia Policy, recognising Communist China and enhancing ties with Indonesia. Conscription was abolished and the remaining Australian troops in Vietnam withdrawn. The Australian national anthem was changed from God Save the Queen to Advance Australia Fair, the imperial honours system was replaced at the Commonwealth level by the Order of Australia, and Queen Elizabeth II was officially styled Queen of Australia. Relations with the US, however, became strained after government members criticised the resumption of the US bombing campaign in North Vietnam.

In Indigenous affairs, the government introduced a policy of self-determination for Aboriginal people in economic, social and political affairs.  Federal expenditure on Aboriginal services increased from $23 million to $141 million during the three years of the government. One of the first acts of the Whitlam Government was to establish a Royal Commission into land rights in the Northern Territory under Justice Woodward. Legislation based on its findings was passed into law by the Fraser Government in 1976, as the Aboriginal Land Rights Act 1976.

As the Whitlam government did not control the Senate, much of its legislation was rejected or amended. After Labor was re-elected with a reduced majority at elections in May 1974, the Senate remained an obstacle to its political agenda. The government's popularity was also harmed by deteriorating economic conditions and a series of political scandals. Increased government spending, rapid wage growth, booming commodity prices and the first OPEC oil shock led to economic instability. The unemployment rate reached post-war high of 3.6 per cent in late 1974 and the annual inflation rate hit 17 per cent.

In 1974–75 the government began negotiations for US$4 billion in foreign loans to fund state development of Australia's mineral and energy resources. Minister Rex Connor conducted secret discussions with a loan broker from Pakistan, and the Treasurer, Jim Cairns, misled parliament about the issue. Arguing the government was incompetent following the Loans Affair, the opposition Liberal-Country Party Coalition delayed passage of the government's money bills in the Senate, until the government would promise a new election. Whitlam refused and the deadlock ended when his government was controversially dismissed by the Governor-General, John Kerr on 11 November 1975. Opposition leader Malcolm Fraser was installed as caretaker Prime Minister, pending an election.

Fraser Government: 1975–83 
The Federal elections of December 1975 resulted in a landslide victory for the Liberal-Country Party Coalition and Malcolm Fraser continued as Prime Minister. The coalition government won subsequent elections in 1977 and 1980, making Fraser the second longest serving Australian Prime Minister up to that time. The Fraser government espoused a policy of administrative competence and economic austerity leavened by progressive humanitarian, social and environmental interventions. The government enacted the Whitlam government's land rights bill with few changes, increased immigration, and resettled Indochinese refugees. It promoted multiculturalism and in 1978 established the Special Broadcasting Service (SBS) as a multicultural broadcaster. In foreign policy, the government continued Labor's friendly relations with China and Indonesia, repaired the frayed relationship with the US and opposed white minority rule in South Africa and Rhodesia. The government also attempted to use its influence with the US and China to limit Soviet expansionism. Environmental policies included banning resource development on Fraser Island and the Great Barrier Reef, creating Kakadu National Park and banning whaling. However, the government refused to use Commonwealth powers to stop the construction of the Franklin Dam in Tasmania in 1982 and the resulting grassroots campaign against the dam contributed to the emergence of an influential Environmental movement in Australia,

On the economic front, the Fraser government followed a "fight inflation first" strategy centred on budget cuts and wage restraint. Welfare benefits were restricted, the universal healthcare system was partially dismantled, and university funding per student cut. However, by the early 1980s economic conditions were deteriorating. The second oil shock in 1979 increased inflation which was exacerbated by a boom in commodity prices and a sharp increase in real wages. An international recession, the collapse of the resources boom and a severe drought in eastern Australia saw unemployment rise. The government responded with Keynesian deficit spending in its 1982 Budget, but by 1983 both unemployment and annual inflation exceeded 10 per cent. At the Federal elections in March 1983 the coalition government was comfortably defeated by Labor under its popular new leader Bob Hawke.

Labor Governments: 1983–1996

The Hawke government pursued a mixture of free market reforms and consensus politics featuring "summits" of government representatives, business leaders, trade unions and non-government organisations in order to reach consensus on key issues such as economic policy and tax reform. The centrepiece of this policy mix was an Accord with trade unions under which wage demands would be curtailed in return for increased social benefits. Welfare payments were increased and better targeted to those on low incomes, and a retirement benefits scheme (superannuation) was extended to most employees. A new universal health insurance scheme, Medicare, was introduced. The Treasurer Paul Keating oversaw a program of deregulation and micro-economic reforms which broke with the Keynesian economics that had traditionally been favoured by the Labor party. These reforms included floating the Australian dollar, deregulating capital markets and allowing competition from foreign banks. Business regulation and competition policy was streamlined, tariffs and quotas on Australian manufactured goods and rural commodities were gradually reduced, and a number of government enterprises and services were progressively privatised. The higher education system was restructured and significantly expanded, partly funded by the reintroduction of fees in the form of student loans and "contributions" (HECS). Paul Kelly concludes that, "In the 1980s both Labor and non-Labor underwent internal philosophical revolutions to support a new set of ideas—faith in markets, deregulation, a reduced role for government, low protection and the creation of a new cooperative enterprise culture."

The Hawke Government courted the growing environmental movement with a series of actions including using Federal powers to stop the Franklin Dam development in Tasmania, banning new uranium mines at Jabiluka, and proposing Kakadu National park for world heritage listing. In foreign policy, the Hawke Government maintained strong relations with the US and was instrumental in the formation of the Asia Pacific Economic Cooperation (APEC) group. Australia contributed naval ships and troops to UN forces in the Gulf War after Iraq had invaded Kuwait in 1990.The government complemented its consensus politics with other initiatives aimed at fostering national unity. The Australia Act 1986 eliminated the last vestiges of British legal authority at the Federal level. The Australian Bicentenary in 1988 was the focus of year-long celebrations with multicultural themes. The World Expo 88 was held in Brisbane and a new Parliament House in Canberra was opened.

Strong economic growth, falling unemployment, an unstable opposition, and Bob Hawke's popularity with the public contributed to the re-election of the Hawke Government in 1984, 1987 and 1990. However, the economy went into recession in 1990 and by late 1991 the unemployment rate had risen above 10 per cent. With the government's popularity falling, Paul Keating successfully challenged for the leadership and became Prime Minister in December 1991.

The Keating government's first priority was economic recovery. In February 1992 it released the "One Nation" job creation package and later legislated tax cuts to corporations and individuals to boost economic growth. Unemployment reached 11.4 per cent in 1992—the highest since the Great Depression in Australia. The Liberal-National Opposition had proposed an ambitious plan of economic reform to take to the 1993 Election, including the introduction of a Goods and Services Tax. Keating campaigned strongly against the tax and was returned to office in March 1993.In May 1994 a more ambitious "Working Nation" jobs program was introduced. The Keating government also pursued a number of "big picture" issues throughout its two terms including increased political and economic engagement in the Asia Pacific region, Indigenous reconciliation, an Australian republic and "efficiency with equity". The government engaged closely with the Indonesian President, Suharto and other regional partners, and successfully campaigned to increase the role of APEC as a major forum for strategic and economic co-operation. A Council for Aboriginal Reconciliation was established and, following the High Court of Australia's historic Mabo decision in 1992, the first national Native Title legislation was introduced to regulate claims and provide compensation for loss of native title. In 1993, Keating established a Republic Advisory Committee to examine options for Australia becoming a republic. The government also introduced family payments and a superannuation guarantee with compulsory employer contributions.

Under the Hawke Government the annual migration intake had more than doubled from 54,500 in 1984–85 to more than 120,000 in 1989–90. The Keating Government responded to community concerns about the pace of immigration by cutting the immigration intake and introducing mandatory detention for illegal immigrants arriving without a valid visa. Immigration fell to 67,900 in 1992–93.

With foreign debt, inflation and unemployment still stubbornly high, and after a series of ministerial resignations, Keating lost the March 1996 Election to the Liberals' John Howard.

Australia in a globalised world: 1996 to present

Howard government: 1996–2007

John Howard with a Liberal–National Party coalition served as Prime Minister from 1996 until 2007, winning re-election in 1998, 2001 and 2004 to become the second-longest serving prime minister after Menzies. One of the first programs instigated by the Howard government was a nationwide gun control scheme following a mass shooting at Port Arthur. The new government saw industrial relations and taxation as two key areas of economic reform which had been left undone by the Hawke-Keating governments. The coalition introduced industrial relations reforms in 1996 which promoted individual contracts and enterprise bargaining. In 2006, it controversially introduced the WorkChoices legislation, which made it easier for small businesses to terminate employment. After the 1996 election, Howard and treasurer Peter Costello proposed a Goods and Services Tax (GST) which they successfully took to the electorate in 1998 and implemented in July 2000.

A political concern for the new government was the significant public support for Pauline Hanson and, later, her One Nation party, which espoused populist policies including winding back free market reforms, Asian immigration and programs for Indigenous Australians. The government responded with public messaging criticising elites and political correctness and emphasising Australian values.  The coalition initially cut immigration intakes, abolished the Office of Multicultural Affairs and other multicultural agencies, and introduced citizenship tests for migrants. Following a sharp increase in unauthorised arrivals by boat from 1999, the government opened new mandatory detention centres in remote areas of Australia and issued temporary visas for those found to be refugees. Following the Children Overboard affair and the Tampa Affair in 2001, the government introduced the Pacific Solution, which involved detaining unauthorised immigrants in detention centres in Nauru and Papua New Guinea while their refugee status was determined, as well as a policy of turning back vessels intercepted at sea.

In Indigenous affairs the Prime Minister rejected calls for a treaty with Indigenous Australians and an apology for past actions which had harmed them. Instead, the government pursued a policy of "practical reconciliation" involving specific measures to improve Indigenous education, health, employment and housing. In response to the High Court's decision in Wik Peoples v Queensland, in 1996, the Howard Government amended native title legislation to limit native title claims. In 2007, following the release of the "Little Children are Sacred" report detailing widespread abuse in Aboriginal communities, the Howard Government launched the Northern Territory Intervention in order to create a safe environment for Indigenous children. The government's response was criticised by the co-chairs of the report, received a divided response from the Indigenous community, but was supported by the Labor opposition.

Honouring a commitment made during the 1996 election campaign, the Howard Government set up a people's convention on an Australian republic. The resulting 1999 referendum on a republic failed. Howard, an avowed monarchist, became the only Australian Prime Minister to publicly oppose a constitutional amendment he had put to the people.

In 1999, Australia led a United Nations force into East Timor to help establish democracy and independence for that nation, following political violence. During this period Australia committed to a number of other peacekeeping and stabilisation operations: notably in Bougainville, including Operation Bel Isi (1998–2003); as well as Operation Helpem Fren and the Australian-led Regional Assistance Mission to Solomon Islands (RAMSI) in the early 2000s; and the 2006 East Timorese crisis. Following the September 2001 terrorist attacks on the US and the subsequent War on Terror, Australia committed troops to the Afghanistan War and the Iraq War. These events, along with the 2002 Bali Bombings and other terrorist incidents, led to the creation of a National Security Committee and further anti-terrorist legislation.

In foreign affairs, the government advocated a policy of  "Asia first, but not Asia only", emphasising traditional links to the Commonwealth and the US. Relations with Indonesia became strained over East Timor but generally improved after the Bali bombings. Australia's support of US policy during the War on Terror was followed by an Australia-United States Free Trade Agreement in 2004. Trade agreements with Singapore and Thailand were also secured and relations with China improved. Australia joined the US in refusing to ratify the Kyoto Protocol on greenhouse gas emissions, arguing that it would harm Australia's economy and would be ineffective without the participation of China and India.

After initial cuts, the immigration intake increased from 92,270 in 1999–2000 to 157,000 in 2005–06, with a bias towards skilled workers to meet the needs of a rapidly growing economy. The immigration intake also became increasingly diverse, with the proportion of immigrants from South Asia increasing from 8 per cent in 1996–97 to 20 per cent in 2007–08. Inbound tourism also grew, helped by the Sydney Olympic games in 2000.

The economy continued its uninterrupted expansion since the early 1990s recession, with record jobs growth and the lowest unemployment rates since the 1970s. Exports and imports grew from a value of about a third of Australia's economic output in the early 1990s to 40 per cent in 2005. China became Australia's second largest trading partner after Japan, and foreign investment in Australia more than doubled. The coalition delivered Budget surpluses in most years which, along with the proceeds of government asset sales – most notably of Telstra – were partly invested in a Future Fund to reduce the national debt. Income inequality and private debt increased as the economy expanded, with the biggest increase in incomes accruing to the top 10 per cent of income earners.

By 2007 the Howard Government was consistently trailing the Labor opposition in opinion polls, with key issues being rising interest rates, the unpopular Work Choices industrial relations reforms, and climate change policy. The government was also hampered by leadership tensions between Howard and Costello and opinion polls indicating a desire for a generational change in leadership (opposition leader Kevin Rudd was eighteen years younger than Howard and widely seen as more vibrant). Labor won the November 2007 election with a swing of more than 5 per cent and Howard became only the second sitting Prime Minister to lose his seat in an election.

Labor Governments: 2007–2013
Kevin Rudd became Prime Minister in December 2007 and held office until June 2010, when he was replaced as leader by Julia Gillard, Australia's first female Prime Minister. Following the August 2010 federal election, Gillard formed a minority Labor government with the support of the Australian Greens and three independents. Gillard was replaced as Prime Minister by Rudd in June 2013, and Labor lost the subsequent September 2013 election.

The first Rudd Government moved quickly to ratify the Kyoto protocols, dismantle the previous government's Work Choices industrial relations reforms, and issue an apology to Aboriginal Australians for past policies, particularly the removal of Aboriginal children from their families. The government was soon confronted by the Global Financial Crisis and subsequent global recession, responding with a series of economic stimulus measures worth A$75 billion. Although economic growth slowed in 2008, Australia was one of the few advanced economies in the world to avoid recession.

Rudd declared climate change "the great moral challenge of our generation" and his government proposed an emissions trading scheme (ETS) to address the issue. The necessary legislation, however, was twice rejected in the Senate when the Opposition and Greens refused to support it. After the December 2009 UN Climate Change Conference in Copenhagen failed to produce an agreed international response to global warming the government decided to postpone its ETS until 2013, a decision which saw Labor lose some electoral support to the Greens. The government also lost some public support when it proposed a Resources Super Profits Tax following the release of the Henry Tax Review in May 2010. The resulting media campaign against the tax by the mining industry particularly affected Labor's support in the resource-rich states of Queensland and Western Australia.

Illegal immigration policy proved another difficult issue for the government, which initially closed the Nauru processing centre, abolished temporary protection visas and took measures to improve the legal rights and processing time for applicants for asylum. However, unauthorised arrivals by boat increased sharply from 2009 and the number in mandatory detention stretched capacity. The new leader of the Opposition, Tony Abbot, promised that a Coalition government would "stop the boats."

In June 2010, with the government behind the Opposition in polls and Rudd's popularity rating falling, the Labor caucus replaced Rudd with Gillard as leader. The new leader was able to negotiate concessions on a new mining tax with large mining companies but failed to reach agreement with East Timor on a proposed migration processing centre there. Following the September 2010 election, the Gillard Government passed a series of legislation with the support of the Greens who now held the balance of power in the Senate. This included enabling legislation for a National Broadband Network, a carbon pricing scheme, a mining tax, a National Disability Insurance Scheme, and school funding reforms.

Illegal immigration policy, however, remained a politically sensitive issue. The government negotiated an agreement with Malaysia to process some people there but the plan did not gain the support of the Opposition or the Greens and was struck down by the High Court. As the number of unauthorised immigrants arriving by boat continued to climb, the government reopened offshore processing centres on Manus Island and Nauru.

In Indigenous affairs, the government introduced, in 2012, a modified policy in the Northern Territory ('Stronger Futures in the Northern Territory') under a 10-year funding agreement. The new policy retained many features of the Northern Territory Intervention but was broader in scope and involved more collaboration with Indigenous stakeholders.

Following mounting leadership speculation and poor polling for the government, Rudd defeated Gillard in a leadership ballot in June 2013 and returned as Prime Minister, promising to replace the carbon tax with an emissions trading scheme and to ensure that people arriving without authority by boat would not be settled in Australia. The Opposition, promising to "stop the boats," abolish the carbon tax and mining tax, and reduce the Budget deficit and government debt, won the September 2013 election.

Liberal-National Coalition Governments: (2013–2022) 

The return of the Liberal-National Coalition to power after six years in opposition initially failed to restore stability to the office of prime minister. Prime Minister Tony Abbott's rival Malcolm Turnbull challenged for and won the leadership of the Liberals within Abbott's first term. After Turnbull narrowly returned the Coalition to office in 2016, Party dissatisfaction with his leadership saw him replaced by Scott Morrison in 2018. 

 Abbott Government (2013–2015)

Prime Minister Tony Abbott's Liberal-National Coalition Government began implementing its policies on unauthorised maritime arrivals, including Operation Sovereign Borders, boat turnbacks, the reintroduction of temporary protection visas, and the resettlement in third countries of those found to be refugees. The new policy strained relations with Indonesia, but the number of people arriving by boat fell from 20,587 in 2013 to none in 2015. The government continued Australia's economic engagement with Asia, signing trade agreements with China, South Korea and Japan. The government also embraced the intervention against Islamic State in Iraq and Syria, joining the air campaign, sending special forces and providing training for the Iraqi army.

The government made cuts to Indigenous programs, brought the Indigenous Affairs portfolio into the Cabinet, and established the Indigenous Advisory Council.

The government's May 2014 Budget, which included measures such as the deregulation of university fees, welfare cuts and projected cuts to funding to the states for health and education, proved unpopular, with the perception that it had involved breaking a number of election promises. The government secured the passage of legislation abolishing the carbon tax (July 2014) and the mining tax (September 2014).

The Prime Minister announced a number of decisions – most notably the reintroduction of knighthoods and a knighthood for Prince Philip, Duke of Edinburgh – which had not been approved by cabinet and which were widely criticised in the media. By September 2015 the government had lost 30 Newspolls in a row and Malcolm Turnbull successfully challenged for the leadership.

Turnbull Government (2015–2018)

The new Turnbull government promised to promote a "smart, agile and innovative Australia" and "jobs and growth". The government announced a National Innovation and Science Agenda and delivered a Budget featuring cuts to company tax. However, the elections of July 2016 saw the government returned with a majority on only one and a minority in the Senate, making it more difficult to secure the passage of government legislation. Following a national postal plebiscite, the government legalised same-sex marriage in December 2017.

In foreign affairs, Australia signed a refugee exchange deal with the US in September 2016, allowing those in detention on Manus Island and Nauru to be settled in the US.  There was increased tension with China because of Australia's criticism of China's policies in the South China Sea, Australia's new laws targeting foreign influence in domestic politics, and a ban, on national security grounds, on Chinese companies supplying Australia's 5G communications network. Trade with China, however, continued to grow.

In 2017, the United States, Japan, India and Australia agreed to revive the Quadrilateral Security Dialogue in order to counter Chinese ambitions in the South China Sea. Australia signed a modified Trans-Pacific Partnership trade agreement with 10 other nations in March 2018 after the US withdrew from the original agreement.

The government lost five by-elections in July 2018. When, in August, the government sought to introduce legislation for a National Energy Guarantee, including a commitment to meet Australia's emissions target under the Paris Agreement, a number of Coalition members vowed to vote against the bill. The resulting controversy further harmed the government, which had already lost more than 30 consecutive Newspolls. The parliamentary Liberal Party elected Scott Morrison as its new leader and he was sworn in as Prime Minister.

 Morrison Government (2018–2022)

The Morrison government committed to remaining in the Paris Agreement, but promised a greater focus on reduction of energy prices. In foreign affairs the government signed the Indonesia–Australia Comprehensive Economic Partnership Agreement (IA-CEPA) in March 2019. In April, the treasurer delivered a Budget focusing on tax cuts, increased spending on roads and other infrastructure, and a forecast return to a surplus. The government was returned at the elections of May 2019 with a three-seat majority.

In 2017, a constitutional convention of 250 Aboriginal and Torres Strait Islander delegates had issued the Uluru Statement from the Heart, calling for the recognition of Indigenous sovereignty, a Makarrata (truth telling and agreement-making) Commission, constitutional recognition of Indigenous Australians and a "voice to parliament". In 2019, the government announced a process to "develop options for a model that will ensure that Aboriginal and Torres Strait Islander people are heard at all levels of government".

Within a year the government was confronted with the international COVID-19 pandemic and the subsequent recession, Australia's first in 29 years. From 1 February 2020, Australia progressively closed its borders to foreign nationals who had recently visited high-risk countries, culminating, on 20 March, in a general ban on the entry of foreign nationals. On 13 March 2020, a National Cabinet, including Australian government, state government and territory government leaders, was created to address the crisis. The national cabinet announced a series of increasingly tighter restrictions on non-essential business, travel and gatherings of people with the aim of suppressing COVID. These restrictions were progressively eased from early May, although individual states and territories intermittently reimposed restrictions in response to particular outbreaks of COVID-19.

The Australian government made provision for $267 billion in economic stimulus measures, and $16.6 billion in health measures in response to COVID-19.  As a result of the COVID-19 recession, the unemployment rate rose from about 5 per cent in February 2020 to 7.5 per cent in July 2020. As the economy began to recover from the second half of 2020, the unemployment rate fell to 5.6 per cent in March 2021 and hours worked returned to pre-recession levels. As at 17 April 2021, Australia was ranked 134 out of 177 countries in the number of COVID-19 deaths per capita.

In June 2021 Australia and the United Kingdom announced that they had struck a preliminary deal on a free-trade agreement.

On 16 September 2021, the government announced that Australia, the United Kingdom and the United States had agreed to the creation of an enhanced trilateral security partnership, dubbed AUKUS. The first initiative under AUKUS would be for Australia to acquire nuclear-powered submarine technology. As a result of the agreement, Australia cancelled its 2016 contract for the diesel-electric Attack-class submarine with the French company Naval Group. China condemned the AUKUS agreement, stating it "seriously undermines regional peace and stability and intensifies the arms race". France announced it would withdraw its ambassador from Australia in protest against the lack of consultation on the security agreement and the cancellation of the $90 billion dollar contract for French submarines.

Albanese government (2022– present) 
On 23 May 2022, Anthony Albanese was sworn in as Australia's new prime minister. His Labor Party defeated Scott Morrison's conservative government in the election. Prime Minister Albanese formed Australia's first Labor government in almost a decade. In December 2022, the prime minister announced that a referendum for an Indigenous Voice to parliament would be held before December 2023.

On 30 January 2023, Albanese unveiled a new national cultural policy 'Revive' with $286 million in funding over four years, labelled the most significant investment in Australian culture since the Keating government. The Revive policy's centrepiece establishes 'Creative Australia', with four new bodies; a First Nations-led body, Music Australia, Writers Australia and the Centre for Arts and Entertainment Workplaces. Revive's legislation also granted protection for First Nations culture as well as funding toward a First Nations languages partnership between First Nations representatives and Australian governments and funding the establishment of a National Aboriginal Art Gallery in Alice Springs and an Aboriginal Cultural Centre in Perth. The policy also provided regulation for a revenue levy for streaming services to reinvest in locally produced cinema and television productions. Revive policy also included the first establishment of a poet laureate for Australia.

Society and culture: 1960s to present

Social developments

Indigenous Australians
In 1960, Aboriginal affairs were still regulated by state governments and, in the Northern Territory, by the Australian government. In most states Aboriginal Australians were banned from drinking alcohol and their freedom of association, movement and control of property was restricted. Queensland, Western Australia and the Northern Territory banned Aboriginal people from voting and Queensland and Western Australia controlled their right to marry. Aboriginals were often subjected to unofficial "colour bars" restricting their access to many goods, services and public facilities, especially in country towns.

The official policy of the Australian government and most state governments, however, was the assimilation of Aboriginal people into mainstream culture: "all aborigines and part-aborigines are expected to eventually attain the same manner of living as other Australians and to live as members of a single Australian community enjoying the same rights and privileges, accepting the same responsibilities, observing the same customs and influenced by the same beliefs, hopes and loyalties as other Australians."

The 1960s was a key decade for Indigenous rights, with the demand for change led by Indigenous activists and organisations such as the Federal Council for the Advancement of Aborigines and Torres Strait Islanders. In 1962, the Menzies Government's Commonwealth Electoral Act gave Indigenous people the right to vote at federal elections. In 1965, Queensland became the last state to confer state voting rights on Aboriginal people.

In 1963, the Yolngu people of Arnhem Land sent a bark petition to the Australian parliament asking for recognition of their traditional land rights. They subsequently took their case to the Supreme Court of the Northern Territory which ruled against them in September 1971.

In 1965, Charles Perkins, helped organise freedom rides into parts of Australia to expose discrimination and inequality. In 1966, the Gurindji people of Wave Hill station commenced the Gurindji strike in a quest for equal pay and recognition of land rights.

In 1966, the Australian government gave Aboriginal people the same rights to social security benefits as other Australians.

A 1967 referendum called by the Holt Government saw Australians vote by a 91 per cent majority to change the Australian constitution to include all Aboriginal Australians in the national census and allow the Federal parliament to legislate on their behalf. A Council for Aboriginal Affairs was established.

Demands for Indigenous self-determination and the preservation of cultural identity were increasingly promoted. In January 1972 Aboriginal activists erected an Aboriginal "tent embassy" on the lawns of parliament house, Canberra and issued a number demands including land rights, compensation for past loss of land and self-determination. The leader of the opposition Gough Whitlam was among those who visited the tent embassy to discuss their demands.

The Whitlam government came to power in December 1972 with a policy of self-determination for Aboriginal people. The government also passed legislation against racial discrimination and established a Royal Commission into land rights in the Northern Territory, which formed the basis for the Fraser government's Aboriginal Land Rights Act 1976.

The Land Rights Act only applied to the Northern Territory, but Aboriginal communities could also acquire land through various state land rights acts or other legislation. By the early 1980s Aboriginal communities had gained title to about 30 per cent of Northern Territory land and 20 per cent of South Australian land. In 1982, the Queensland government granted Aboriginal reserve land to its occupiers but the grants gave limited rights and was revocable at any time. Only a small proportion of land in other states had been transferred to traditional owners. In 1985, the Hawke government handed over Uluru (Ayers Rock) to traditional owners with a lease back to the Commonwealth. In 1987, the West Australian government granted Aboriginal reserve land (amounting to 7 per cent of the state's land) to traditional owners on 50 year and 99 year leases. Key issues for Indigenous communities with recognised land rights included security of title, the protection of culturally significant sites, and the right to veto, or to be adequately compensated for, mining and development on their land. Compensation for previous dispossession of land was an unresolved issue.

In 1992, the High Court of Australia handed down its decision in the Mabo Case, holding that Indigenous native title survived reception of English law and continued to exist unless extinguished by conflicting law or interests in land. The Keating government passed a Native Title Act in 1993 to regulate native title claims and established a Native Title Tribunal to hear those claims. In the subsequent Wik decision of 1996, the High Court found that a pastoral lease did not necessarily extinguish native title. In response, the Howard government amended the Native Title Act to provide better protection for pastoralists and others with an interest in land.  By March 2019 the Native Titles Tribunal had determined that 375 Indigenous communities had established native title over 39 per cent of the Australian continent, with one third under exclusive title.

From 1960 the Indigenous population grew faster than the Australian population as a whole and increasingly lived in urban areas. The Aboriginal population was 106,000 in 1961 (1 per cent of the total population), with 20 per cent living in capital cities compared with 40 per cent for the population as a whole. In 2016, the Indigenous population was 786,900 (3 per cent of the population), with a third living in major cities compared with more than two-thirds of people who were not indigenous. While most of this growth was due to a higher Indigenous birth rate, people of Indigenous descent were also more willing to identify as Indigenous. According to Richard Broome: "identification as Indigenous is almost universal among those with a claim due to the growing pride in Indigenous identity in the face of stronger community acceptance."

Despite the drift to large cities, the period from 1965 to 1980 also saw a movement of Indigenous Australians away from towns and settlements to small outstations (or homelands), particularly in Arnhem Land and Central Australia. The movement to outstations was associated with a wider trend for the revival of traditional culture. However, the expense of providing infrastructure to small remote communities has seen pressure from federal, state and territory governments to redirect funding towards larger Indigenous communities.

From 1971 to 2006, indicators for Indigenous employment, median incomes, home ownership, education and life expectancy all improved, although they remained well below the level for those who were not indigenous. In 2008, the Council of Australian Governments created targets for "closing the gap" in inequality in a number of key areas of education, employment, literacy and child mortality. By 2020, the outcomes for Indigenous Australians improved in most of these areas. However, the gap widened for child mortality and school attendance, and targets for closing the inequality gap were not met for employment and child literacy and numeracy. Targets for closing the gap in early childhood education and Year 12 school attainment were on track.

High rates of Indigenous incarceration and deaths in custody were highlighted by the report of the Royal Commission into Aboriginal Deaths in Custody in April 1991. The Keating government responded with $400 million in new spending to address some of the recommendations of the report. However, by 2001 Indigenous incarceration rates and deaths in custody had increased. Deaths in custody continued at an average of 15 per year during the decade to 2018.

Richard Broome has concluded: "To close the gap [between Indigenous and other Australians] on inequality and well being will take many years; some despairingly say generations. Compensation for lost wages, for missing out on native title settlements and for being removed from one's family and kin remain unresolved."

Women

Holmes and Pinto point out that in 1960 domesticity and motherhood were still the dominant conceptions of femininity. In 1961, women made up only 25 per cent of employed adults and twice as many women described their occupation as "home duties" compared with those in paid employment. The fertility rate fell from a post-war high of 3.5 to less than 2 in the 1970s and 1980s.

The reforming drive of the 1960s and the increasing influence of the women's movement led to a series of legislative and institutional changes. These included the abolition of the "marriage bar" in the Australian public service in 1966, the Arbitration Commission's equal pay decisions of 1969 and 1972, the introduction of paid maternity leave in the Australian public service in 1973, and the enactment of the federal Sex Discrimination Act in 1984 and the Affirmative Action Act of 1986.

Single mothers' benefits were introduced in 1973 and the Family Law Act 1975 bought in no-fault divorce. From the 1980s there was an increase in government funding of women's refuges, health centres, rape crisis centres and information services. The Australian government began funding child care with the Child Care Act of 1972, although state, territory and local government were still the main providers of funding. In 1984, the Australian government introduced standardised fee relief for child care, and funding was greatly expanded in 1990 by the decision to extend fee relief to commercial child care centres.

According to Holmes and Pinto, reliable birth control, increased employment opportunities, and improved family welfare and childcare provision increased opportunities for women outside motherhood and domesticity. In 2019–20, women were more likely than men to hold a bachelor's degree or higher qualification. Sixty-eight per cent of women aged 20–74 years old participated in the labour force, compared with 78 per cent of men. However, 43 per cent of employed women were working part-time, compared with 16 per cent of men, and the average earnings of women working full-time was 14 per cent below that of men.

In the five-to-ten years to 2020, the number of women in private sector leadership roles, female federal Justices and Judges, and federal parliamentarians have all increased gradually. However, between 1999 and 2021, Australia has fallen from ninth to 50th in the Inter-Parliamentary Union's ranking of countries by women's representation in national parliaments.

Migrants and cultural diversity 

In 1961, just over 90 per cent of the Australian population had been born in Australia, New Zealand, the UK or Ireland. Another eight per cent had been born in continental Europe. The White Australia policy was in force and migrants were expected to assimilate into the Australian way of life. As the White Australia policy was gradually dismantled in the 1960s and formally abolished in 1973, governments developed a policy of multiculturalism to manage Australia's increasing cultural diversity. In August 1973 Labor's immigration minister Al Grassby announced his vision of A Multi‐Cultural Society for the Future and a policy of cultural pluralism based on principles of social cohesion, equality of opportunity and cultural identity soon gained bipartisan support. The Galbally Report on migrant services in 1978 recommended that: "every person should be able to maintain his or her culture without prejudice or disadvantage and should be encouraged to understand and embrace other cultures." In response to the report, the Fraser government expanded funding for settlement services, established the Australian Institute of Multicultural Affairs (AIMA), funded multicultural and community language education programs in schools and established the multi-lingual Special Broadcasting Service (SBS). State and territory government programs to support multiculturalism followed.

By the late 1980s Australia had a high migrant intake which included significant numbers of new arrivals from Asian and Middle‐Eastern countries, leading to public debate on immigration policy. In 1984, the historian Geoffrey Blainey called for a reduction in Asian immigration in the interests of social cohesion. In 1988, the opposition Leader, John Howard called for the abandonment of multiculturalism, a reduction in Asian immigration, and a focus on 'One Australia'. In the same year, the government's FitzGerald review of immigration recommended a sharper economic focus in the selection of immigrants. In 1989, the Hawke government released its National Agenda for a Multicultural Australia which endorsed respect for cultural diversity and the need for settlement services, but indicated that pluralism was limited by the need for "an overriding and unifying commitment to Australia".

Multicultural programs continued to expand between 1986 and 1996 with an emphasis on addressing disadvantage in migrant communities as well as settlement services for recent migrants. James Walter argues that the Hawke and Keating governments (1983–96) also promoted high migration as a means of improving Australia's competitive advantage in a globalised market.

In 1996, Pauline Hanson, a newly elected independent member of parliament, called for a cut in Asian immigration and an end to multiculturalism. In 1998, her One Nation Party gained 23 per cent of the vote in the Queensland elections. The Howard Government (1996 to 2007) initially abolished a number of multicultural agencies and reduced funding to some migrant services as part of a general program of budget cuts. In 1999, the government adopted a policy of "Australian multiculturalism" with an emphasis on citizenship and adherence to "Australian values".

Following the 11 September 2001 terrorist attacks in the US, the Bali bombings and other terrorist incidents, some media and political commentary sought to link terrorism with Islam. In 2004, the Human Rights and Equal Opportunity Commission (HREOC) reported an increase in vilification and violence against Australian Muslims and some other minority ethnic groups. The government increased funding for multicultural, citizenship and settlement programs, with an emphasis on the promotion of social cohesion and security. The annual immigration intake also increased substantially as the economy boomed, from 67,900 in 1998–99 to 148,200 in 2006–07. The proportion of migrants selected for their skills increased from 30 per cent in 1995–96 to 68 per cent in 2006–07.

Immigration continued to grow under the Labor government (2007–13) with prime minister Kevin Rudd proclaiming a "big Australia" policy. The immigration intake averaged around 190,000 a year from 2011–12 to 2015–16, a level based on research indicating the optimum level to increase economic output per head of population. India and China became the largest source countries of new migrants. The immigration intake was reduced to 160,000 in 2018–19 as some State governments complained that high immigration was adding to urban congestion. The opposition also linked high immigration with low wages growth while the One Nation party continued to oppose high immigration while proclaiming: "It's okay to be white.".

By 2020, 30 per cent of the Australian population were born overseas. The top five countries of birth for those born overseas were England, China, India, New Zealand and the Philippines. Australia's population encompassed migrants born in almost every country in the world,

Arts and culture
The 1960s and 1970s saw increased government support for the arts and the flourishing of distinctively Australian artistic works. The Gorton government (1968–71) established the Australian Council for the Arts, the Australian Film Development Corporation (AFDC) and the National Film and Television Training School. The Whitlam government (1972–75) established the Australia Council with funding to promote crafts, Aboriginal arts, literature, music, visual arts, theatre, film and television.

In 1966, a television drama quota was introduced requiring broadcasters to show 30 minutes of locally produced drama each week. The police series Homicide (1964–67) became the highest rating program and the family drama Skippy the Bush Kangaroo became a local and international success. By 1969 eight of the twelve most popular television programs were Australian. With these successes, locally produced dramas became a staple of Australian television in the 1970s and 1980s. Notable examples include Rush (1973–76), The Sullivans (1976–83) and Neighbours (1985–present).

From the late 1960s a "new wave" of Australian theatre emerged, initially centred on small theatre groups such as the Pram Factory, La Mama and the Australian Performing Group in Melbourne and the Jane Street Theatre and Nimrod Theatre Company in Sydney. Playwrights associated with the new wave included David Williamson, Alex Buzo, Jack Hibberd and John Romeril. Features of the new wave were the extensive use of Australian colloquial speech (including obscenities), the exploration of the Australian identity, and the critique of cultural myths. By the end of the 1970s new Australian plays were a feature of small and large theatre companies in most states.

Support through the AFDC (from 1975 the Australian Film Commission) and state funding bodies, and generous tax concessions for investors introduced in 1981, led to a large increase in Australian produced films. Almost 400 were produced between 1970 and 1985. Notable films include The Adventures of Barry McKenzie (1972), Picnic at Hanging Rock (1975), My Brilliant Career (1979), Breaker Morant (1980), Gallipoli (1981), the Mad Max trilogy (1979–85) and Crocodile Dundee (1986).

In 1973, Patrick White became the first Australian to win a Nobel Prize for Literature. While there were only around twenty Australian novels published in 1973, this had grown to around 300 in 1988. By 1985 more than 1,000 writers had received grants and more than 1,000 books had been subsidised by the Literature Board. Writers who published their first book between 1975 and 1985 include Peter Carey, David Malouf, Murray Bail, Elizabeth Jolley, Helen Garner and Tim Winton.

There was also a growing recognition of Indigenous cultural movements. In the early 1970s Aboriginal elders at Papunya began using acrylic paints to make "dot" paintings based on the traditional Honey Ant Dreaming. Indigenous artists from other regions also developed distinctive styles based on a fusion of modern art materials and traditional stories and iconography. Indigenous writers such as Oodgeroo Noonuccal (Kath Walker), Jack Davis and Kevin Gilbert produced significant work in the 1970s and 1980s. A National Black Theatre was established in Sydney in the early 1970s. The Aboriginal Islander Dance Theatre was established in 1976 and the Bangarra Dance Theatre in 1989. In 1991, the rock band Yothu Yindi, which drew on traditional Aboriginal music and dance, achieved commercial and critical success.

In music, ABC television's popular music show Countdown (1974–87) helped promote Australian music while radio station 2JJ (later JJJ) in Sydney promoted live performances and recordings by Australian independent artists and record labels.

Carter and Griffen-Foley state that by the end of the 1970s: "There was a widely shared sense of Australian culture as independent, no longer troubled by its relationship with Britain." However, by 1990 commentators as diverse as P. P. McGuiness and Geoffrey Serle were complaining that the large increase in artistic works had led to the celebration of mediocrity. Poet Chris Wallace-Crabbe questioned whether Australia had overcome its former "cultural cringe" only to fall into cultural overconfidence.

In the new millennium, the globalisation of the Australian economy and society, and developments in jet travel and the internet have largely overcome the "tyranny of distance" which had influenced Australian arts and culture. Overseas cultural works could be more readily accessed in person or virtually. Australian performers such as the Australian Ballet and Australian Chamber Orchestra frequently toured abroad. The growing number of international art exhibitions, such as Art Basel Hong Kong and the Queensland Art Gallery's Asia-Pacific Triennial of Contemporary Art, have increased the exposure of Australian art in the region and the wider global market.

In film, the number of Australian productions averaged 14 per year in the 1970s but grew to 31 per year in the 2000s and 37 per year in the 2010s. A number of Australian directors and actors, including Baz Luhrmann, George Miller, Peter Weir, Cate Blanchett, Nicole Kidman, Geoffrey Rush and others, have been able to establish careers both in Australia and abroad. The technical expertise developed in the Australian industry, and the increasing number of internationally successful Australian directors and actors, encouraged foreign producers to make more films in Australia. Major international productions made in Australia in the past decade include Mad Max: Fury Road and The Great Gatsby.

Carter and Griffen-Follet conclude: "Australia is no longer a Dominion or client state within a closed imperial market, but a medium-sized player, exporter as well as importer, within globalised cultural industries and markets."

Historiography

According to Stuart MacIntyre, the first Australian histories, such as those by William Wentworth and James Macarthur, were polemical works written to influence public opinion and British government policy in the colony. After the Australian colonies became self-governing in the 1850s, colonial governments commissioned histories aimed at promoting migration and investment from Britain. The beginning of professional academic history in Australian universities from 1891 saw the dominance of an Imperial framework for interpreting Australian history, in which Australia emerged from the successful transfer of people, institutions, and culture from Britain. The apogee of the imperial school of Australian history was the Australian volume of the Cambridge History of the British Empire published in 1933.

Military history received government support after the First World War, most prominently with Charles Bean's 12 volume History of Australia in the War of 1914–1918 (1921–42). Bean's earlier work as Australia's official war correspondent had helped establish the Anzac legend which, according to McKenna: "immediately supplanted all other narratives of nationhood – the march of the explorers, the advance of settlement, Eureka, Federation and Australia's record of progressive democratic legislation."

Radical nationalist interpretations of Australian history became more prominent from the 1930s. Brian Fitzpatrick published a series of histories from 1939 to 1941 which sought to demonstrate the exploitative nature of Britain's economic relationship with Australia and the role of the labour movement in a struggle for social justice and economic independence. One of the most influential works of the radical nationalist trend was Russel Ward's The Australian Legend (1958) which sought to trace the origins of a distinctive democratic national ethos from the experiences of the convicts, bushrangers, gold-diggers, drovers and shearers. In the 1960s Marxist historians such as Bob Gollan and Ian Turner explored the relationship of the labour movement to radical nationalist politics.

The rapid expansion of university history departments in the 1950s and 1960s saw an increasing diversity of interpretations and specialisations in Australian history. A number of academic historians still worked within the imperial history tradition, while others explored the contribution of liberal, conservative and other traditions to Australia's distinctive political, cultural and economic development. In the first two volumes of his History of Australia (1962, 1968) Manning Clark developed an idiosyncratic interpretation of Australian history telling the story of "epic tragedy" in which "the explorers, Governors, improvers, and perturbators vainly endeavoured to impose their received schemes of redemption on an alien, intractable setting". According to MacIntyre, Clark  "had few imitators and the successive volumes had a much greater impact on the public than the profession." The 1964 book The Lucky Country by Donald Horne was scathing in its observations of a complacent, dull, anti-intellectual and provincial Australia, with a swollen suburbia and absence of innovation–its title has been frequently misinterpreted as complimentary, though Horne meant it unfavourably. Another notable "big picture" interpretation of Australian history from this period is Geoffrey Blainey's The Tyranny of Distance (1966).

The 1970s saw a number of challenges to traditional imperial and nationalist interpretations of Australian history. Humphrey McQueen in A New Britannia (1970) attacked radical nationalist historical narratives from a Marxist New Left perspective. Anne Summers in Damned Whores and God's Police (1975) and Miriam Dixson in The Real Matilda (1976) analysed the role of women in Australian history. Others explored the history of those marginalised because of their sexuality or ethnicity. Oral history became an increasingly prominent addition to traditional archival sources in a number of topic areas. Wendy Lowenstein's Weevils in the Flour (1978), a social history of the Great Depression, is a notable early example.

There was also a revival in Aboriginal history. Notable works include Charles Rowley's The Destruction of Aboriginal Society (1970), Henry Reynolds' The Other Side of the Frontier (1981) and Peter Reid's work on Aboriginal children who had been removed from their parents.  While Indigenous-settler relations remains an important field, Reid states that in the past few decades historians of Indigenous Australia have increasingly explored local histories and "the changing internal relations between individuals and family, clan and community."

Academic history continued to be influenced by British, American and European trends in historical method and modes of interpretation. Post-structuralist ideas on the relationship between language and meaning were influential in the 1980s and 1990s, for example, in Greg Dening's Mr Bligh's Bad Language (1992). Memory studies and Pierre Nora's ideas on the relationship between memory and history influenced work in a number of fields including military history, ethnographic history, oral history and historical work in Australian museums. Interdisciplinary histories drawing on the insights of fields such as sociology, anthropology, cultural studies and environmental studies have become more common since the 1980s. Transnational approaches which analyse Australian history in a global and regional context have also flourished in recent decades.

Historians such as McKenna, MacIntyre and others point out that in the 21st century most historical works are not created by academic historians, and public conceptions of Australia's history are more likely to be shaped by popular histories, historical fiction and drama, the media, the internet, museums and public institutions. Popular histories by amateur historians regularly outsell work by academic historians. The internet and developments in digital technology mean that individuals and community groups can readily research, produce and distribute their own historical works. Local histories and family histories have proliferated in recent decades. A 2003 survey by the University of Technology, Sydney found that 32 per cent of respondents had engaged in family history or a history-related hobby.

These developments, along with the prevalence of interdisciplinary histories, have led some Australian historians to question the boundaries of history as an academic discipline. MacIntyre has questioned the claim that specialised procedures and forms of communication can protect the discipline from "the natural impulses of humanity" and "popular history". Clark and Ashton have stated that: "The accessibility of history has fundamentally changed how we perceive the discipline and raises an important question: Can anyone be an historian today?" Historians have also questioned the boundaries between historical writing and other activities, particularly when they argue that groups have been marginalised by academic histories. Peter Reid states that  "Aboriginal history today takes form in dance, art, novel, biography, autobiography, oral history, archival research, family papers, drama, poetry and film."

History wars 
The history wars were a series of public disputes about interpretations of Australian history involving historians, politicians and media commentators which occurred between approximately 1993 and 2007 but which had their roots in the revisionist histories from the 1970s and political debates about multiculturalism, Indigenous land rights, the stolen generations and national identity.

In a 1993 lecture, Geoffrey Blainey made a distinction between a "three cheers" view of history which saw Australian history as largely a success, and a "black armband" view which claimed that "much of Australian history was a disgrace". He opined that the "black armband view of history might well represent the swing of the pendulum from a position that had been too favourable, too self-congratulatory, to an opposite extreme that is even more unreal and decidedly jaundiced".

Three years later, the Prime Minister John Howard referred to Blainey's speech stating, "I profoundly reject the black armband view of Australian history. I believe the balance sheet of Australian history is a very generous and benign one. I believe that, like any other nation, we have black marks upon our history but amongst the nations of the world we have a remarkably positive history." He later defined black armband history as the view "that most Australian history since 1788 has been little more than a disgraceful story of imperialism, exploitation, racism, sexism and other forms of discrimination" and stated his intention to "ensure that our history as a nation is not written definitively by those who take the view that we should apologise for most of it."  In 1997, Howard repeated his criticism of black armband history in the context of the political controversies about Indigenous native title and the Stolen Generations, stating that contemporary Australians should not be held accountable for wrongs committed by past generations.

A number of historians, including Henry Reynolds, Elaine Thompson and Don Watson, responded publicly, variously accusing the prime minister of seeking to rewrite history to exclude the critical analysis of Australia's past and of misrepresenting recent Australian historiography for political purposes. However, historian Patrick O'Farrell, agreed with John Howard that the "guilt school of Australian history has gone too far".

In August 1996, the Brisbane newspaper The Courier-Mail published a series of articles alleging that Manning Clark (who had died in 1991 and had been closely associated with the opposition Labor party since 1972) had been "an agent of influence" for the Soviet Union. The newspaper explicitly linked its allegations to current political debates about Australia's history. John Howard commented that he considered Clark an unduly pessimistic black armband historian. The Press Council later found that the newspaper had had insufficient evidence for its allegation that Clark had been a Soviet agent.

The Human Rights and Equal Opportunities Commission (HREOC), in 1997, released its Bringing Them Home report on the forced removal of Indigenous children from their families. The report found that between 10 per cent and 33 per cent of Aboriginal children had been forcibly separated from their parents between 1910 and 1970. The authors of the report stated that the policy of forced removals amounted to genocide and called for an apology to, and compensation for, the victims. Prime minister Howard offered his personal regret for the forced removals but he refused to offer a parliamentary apology, arguing that it might prejudice future legal actions and no government should be expected to apologise for the actions of previous governments. The release of the report and the government's response sparked a heated political, media and public debate about the facts of forced removals and the appropriate political response.

The anthropologist Ron Brunton published a paper in 1998 criticising the HREOC inquiry on various grounds including that the inquiry has not tested the claims of witnesses against the historical record. In 2000, the government claimed that a maximum of 10 per cent of Aboriginal children had been separated from their parents and that the policy was lawful and well-intentioned. A number of historians, including Janet McCalman and Anna Haebich, contributed to the political and academic debate.

Keith Windschuttle published a series of articles in 2000 in which he argued that claims of frontier massacres and the Aboriginal death toll in frontier violence had been exaggerated by historians. In a subsequent book The Fabrication of Aboriginal History  (2002) Windschuttle argued that there had been no genocide of Aboriginal Tasmanians and that historians had systematically misrepresented evidence about the nature and extent of violence against Aboriginal Tasmanians for political reasons. Geoffrey Blainey praised the book and it sparked a widespread and often acrimonious academic, media and public debate about settler violence against Aboriginal people and about Windschuttle's criticisms of particular historians.

A new battlefront in the history wars opened in 2000 when the council of the National Museum of Australia commissioned the historian Graeme Davison to review the explanatory labels for the museum's inaugural exhibition to determine whether they amounted to "the reworking of Australian history into political correctness." Davison found no political bias in the labels and the exhibition went ahead with the opening of the museum in March 2001. Following a number of media allegations of left-wing political bias in the museum's exhibitions, the museum council initiated another review which, in 2003, found that there was no systemic political or cultural bias in the museum. A number of historians publicly criticised the inquiry as political interference in the independence of the museum. In 2006, a Sydney newspaper reported that the director of the museum, Peter Morton was systematically reworking the collection, stating: "I want people to come out feeling good about Australia."

See also

Australian archaeology
Australian telegraphic history
Economic history of Australia
Europeans in Oceania
History of Oceania
History of broadcasting#Australia
History of monarchy in Australia
Immigration history of Australia
List of conflicts in Australia
List of towns and cities in Australia by year of foundation
Military history of Australia
Territorial evolution of Australia
Timeline of Australian history
Whaling in Australia
Women in Australia

References

Reference books

 
 Barker, Anthony. What Happened When: A Chronology of Australia from 1788. Allen & Unwin. 2000. online edition
 Bambrick, Susan ed. The Cambridge Encyclopedia of Australia (1994)
 Basset, Jan The Oxford Illustrated Dictionary of Australian History (1998)
 
 Davison, Graeme, John Hirst, and Stuart Macintyre, eds. The Oxford Companion to Australian History (2001) online at many academic libraries; 
 Galligan, Brian, and Winsome Roberts, eds. Oxford Companion to Australian Politics (2007); online at many academic libraries
 
 O'Shane, Pat et al. Australia: The Complete Encyclopedia (2001)
 Serle. Percival, ed. Dictionary of Australian Biography (1949)online edition
 Shaw, John, ed. Collins Australian Encyclopedia (1984)
 Taylor, Peter. The Atlas of Australian History (1991)

Historical surveys

 Atkinson, Alan. The Europeans in Australia: A History. Volume 2: Democracy. (2005). 440 pp.
 Bolton, Geoffrey. The Oxford History of Australia: Volume 5: 1942–1995. The Middle Way (2005) online
 Clarke, Frank G. The History of Australia (2002). online edition
 Day, David. Claiming a Continent: A New History of Australia (2001)
 Dickey, Brian. No charity there: A short history of social welfare in Australia (Routledge, 2020).
 Edwards, John. Curtin's Gift: Reinterpreting Australia's Greatest Prime Minister, (2005) online edition
 Firth, Stewart. Australia in international politics: an introduction to Australian foreign policy (Routledge, 2020).
 Hughes, Robert. The Fatal Shore: The Epic of Australia's Founding (1988). 
 Irving, Terry and Connell, Raewyn. Class Structure in Australian History (1992), Longman Cheshire: Melbourne.
 Kelly, Paul. The End of Certainty: Power, Politics & Business in Australia (2008); originally published as The End of Certainty: The Story of the 1980s (1994)
 Kingston, Beverley. The Oxford History of Australia: Volume 3: 1860–1900 Glad, Confident Morning (1993)
 Kociumbas, Jan The Oxford History of Australia: Volume 2: 1770–1860 Possessions (1995)
 Macintyre, Stuart. The Oxford History of Australia: Volume 4: 1901–42, the Succeeding Age (1993) online
 Macintyre, Stuart. A Concise History of Australia (2nd. ed. 2009) excerpt and text search 
 Martin, A. W. Robert Menzies: A Life (2 vol 1993–99), online at ACLS e-books
 McQueen, Humphrey. A New Britannia (1970) University of Queensland Press, Brisbane.
 Megalogenis, George. The Longest Decade (2nd ed. 2008), politics 1990–2008
 Millar, T. B. Australia in peace and war : external relations 1788–1977 (1978) online, 612pp

 Schreuder, Deryck, and Stuart Ward, eds. Australia's Empire (Oxford History of the British Empire Companion Series) (2008) excerpt and text search DOI:10.1093/acprof:oso/9780199563739.001.0001 online
 Taflaga, Marija. A short political history of Australia. In Peter J. Chen, et al. eds. Australian politics and policy (Sydney UP, 2019). . online
 Welsh, Frank. Australia: A New History of the Great Southern Land (2008)
 White, Richard. Inventing Australia (Routledge, 2020), historiography.

Early recorded history

Books

 Anderson, Grahame: The Merchant of the Zeehaen: Isaac Gilsemans and the Voyages of Abel Tasman. (Wellington: Te Papa Press, 2001)
 Ariese, Csilla: Databases of the People Aboard the VOC Ships Batavia (1629) & Zeewijk (1727): An Analysis of the Potential for Finding the Dutch Castaways' Human Remains in Australia. (Australian National Centre of Excellence for Maritime Archaeology, Department of Maritime Archaeology, Western Australian Museum, 2012)
 Bonke, H.: De zeven reizen van de Jonge Lieve: Biografie van een VOC-schip, 1760–1781 [The seven voyages of the Jonge Lieve: A biography of a VOC ship]. (Nijmegen: SUN, 1999) [in Dutch]
 Bontekoe, Willem Ysbrandsz: Memorable Description of the East Indian Voyage, 1618–25. Translated from the Dutch by C.B. Bodde-Hodgkinson, with an introduction and notes by Pieter Geyl. (London: G. Routledge & Sons, 1929)
 Dash, Mike: Batavia's Graveyard: The True Story of the Mad Heretic Who Led History's Bloodiest Mutiny. (New York: Crown, 2002)
 Day, Alan: The A to Z of the Discovery and Exploration of Australia. (Scarecrow Press, 2009)
 De Vlamingh, Willem: De ontdekkingsreis van Willem Hesselsz. de Vlamingh in de jaren 1696–1697. Edited by Günter Schilder. 2 vols. "WLV," Vols. LXXVIII, LXXIX. (The Hague: Martinus Nijhoff, 1976) [in Dutch]
 Drake-Brockman, Henrietta: Voyage to Disaster: The Life of Francisco Pelsaert Covering His Indian Report to the Dutch East India Company and the Wreck of the Ship 'Batavia' in 1629 Off the Coast of Western Australia Together With the Full Text of His Journals, Concerning the Rescue Voyages, the Mutiny On the Abrolhos Islands and the Subsequent Trials of the Mutineers. [Translated from the Dutch by E. D. Drok]. (Sydney: Angus & Robertson, 1963)
 Duyker, Edward: The Dutch in Australia [Australian Ethnic Heritage series]. (Melbourne: AE Press, 1987)
 Duyker, Edward (ed.): The Discovery of Tasmania: Journal Extracts from the Expeditions of Abel Janszoon Tasman and Marc-Joseph Marion Dufresne 1642 & 1772. (Hobart: St David's Park Publishing/Tasmanian Government Printing Office, 1992, pp. 106)
 Duyker, Edward: Mirror of the Australian Navigation by Jacob Le Maire: A Facsimile of the 'Spieghel der Australische Navigatie.' Being an Account of the Voyage of Jacob Le Maire and Willem Schouten (1615–1616), published in Amsterdam in 1622. Hordern House for the Australian National Maritime Museum, Sydney, 1999, 202 pp
 Edwards, Hugh: Islands of Angry Ghosts: Murder, Mayhem and Mutiny: The Story of the Batavia. Originally published in 1966. (New York: William Morrow & Co., 1966; HarperCollins, 2000)
 Edwards, Hugh: The Wreck on the Half-Moon Reef. (Adelaide: Rigby Limited, 1970)
 Fitzsimons, Peter: Batavia: Betrayal, Shipwreck, Murder, Sexual Slavery, Courage: A Spine-Chilling Chapter in Australian History. (Sydney: Random House Australia, 2011)
 Gerritsen, Rupert; Cramer, Max; Slee, Colin: The Batavia Legacy: The Location of the First European Settlement in Australia, Hutt River, 1629. (Geraldton: Sun City Print, 2007)
 Godard, Philippe: The First and Last Voyage of the Batavia. (Perth: Abrolhos, 1994)
 Green, Jeremy N.: Treasures from the 'Vergulde Draeck' (Gilt Dragon). (Perth: Western Australian Museum, 1974)
 Green, Jeremy N.: The Loss of the Verenigde Oostindische Compagnie Jacht 'Vergulde Draeck', Western Australia 1656. An Historical Background and Excavation Report With an Appendix On Similar Loss of the Fluit 'Lastdrager' [2 volumes]. (Oxford: British Archaeological Reports, 1977)
 Green, Jeremy N.: The Loss of the Verenigde Oostindische Compagnie Retourschip 'Batavia', Western Australia, 1629. An Excavation Report and Catalogue of Artefacts. (Oxford: British Archaeological Reports, 1989)
 Heeres, J. E.: Het aandeel der Nederlanders in de ontdekking van Australië, 1606–1765. (Leiden: Brill, 1899) [in Dutch]
 Heeres, J. E.: The Part Borne by the Dutch in the Discovery of Australia, 1606–1765. (Published by the Royal Dutch Geographical Society in Commemoration of the XXVth Anniversary of Its Foundation, 1899)
 Heeres J. E. (ed.): Abel Janszoon Tasman's Journal of His Discovery of Van Diemens Land and New Zealand in 1642: With Documents Relating to His Exploration of Australia in 1644. (Amsterdam: Frederick Muller, 1898)
 Henderson, Graeme: Unfinished Voyages: Western Australian Shipwrecks, 1622–1850. (Nedlands: University of Western Australia Press, 1980)
 Henderson, J.: Sent Forth a Dove: The Discovery of Duyfken. (Nedlands: University of Western Australia Press, 1999, 232pp)
 Hiatt, Alfred; Wortham, Christopher; et al. (eds.): European Perceptions of Terra Australis. (Farnham: Ashgate, 2011)
 Hoving, Ab; Emke, Cor: De schepen van Abel Tasman [The Ships of Abel Tasman]. (Hilversum: Uitgeverij Verloren, 2000) [in Dutch]
 Kenny, John: Before the First Fleet: European Discovery of Australia, 1606–1777. Kangaroo Press, 1995, 192 pp
 Leys, Simon: The Wreck of the Batavia. A True Story. (New York: Thunder's Mouth Press, 2005)
 McHugh, Evan: 1606: An Epic Adventure. (Sydney: University of New South Wales Press, 2006)
 Mundle, Rob: Great South Land: How Dutch Sailors found Australia and an English Pirate almost beat Captain Cook. (ABC Books, 2016)
 Murdoch, Priscilla: Duyfken and the First Discoveries of Australia. Artarmon, N.S.W.: Antipodean Publishers, 1974
 Mutch, T. D.: The First Discovery of Australia – With an Account of the Voyage of the "Duyfken" and the Career of Captain Willem Jansz. (Sydney, 1942) Reprinted from the Journal of the Royal Australian Historical Society, Vol. XXVIII., Part V
 Nichols, Robert; Woods, Martin (eds.): Mapping Our World: Terra Incognita to Australia. (Canberra: National Library of Australia, 2013)
 Pelsaert, Francisco: The Batavia Journal of Francisco Pelsaert (1629). Edited and translated by Marit van Huystee. (Fremantle, W.A.: Western Australian Maritime Museum, 1998)
 Peters, Nonja: The Dutch Down Under, 1606–2006. (Nedlands: University of Western Australia Press, 2006)
 Playford, Phillip: The Wreck of the Zuytdorp on the Western Australian Coast in 1712. (Nedlands: Royal Western Australian Historical Society, 1960)
 Playford, Phillip: Carpet of Silver: The Wreck of the Zuytdorp. (Nedlands: University of Western Australia Press, 1996)
 Playford, Phillip: Voyage of Discovery to Terra Australis by Willem de Vlamingh in 1696–97. [Includes journal of Willem Vlamingh translated from an early 18th-century manuscript held in the Archives Nationales de France]. (Perth: Western Australian Museum, 1998)
 Pearson, Michael: Great Southern Land: The Maritime Exploration of Terra Australis. (Canberra: Department of Environment and Heritage, 2005)
 Quanchi, Max; Robson, John: Historical Dictionary of the Discovery and Exploration of the Pacific Islands. (Lanham, MD and Oxford: Scarecrow Press, 2005)
 Richards, Michael; O'Connor, Maura (eds.): Changing Coastlines: Putting Australia on the World Map, 1493–1993. (Canberra: National Library of Australia, 1993)
 Robert, Willem C. H.: The Explorations, 1696–1697, of Australia by Willem de Vlamingh. Extracts from Two Log-Books Concerning the Voyage to and Explorations on the Coast of Western Australia and from Other Documents Relating to this Voyage. [Original Dutch texts]. (Amsterdam: Philo Press, 1972)
 Robert, Willem C. H.: The Dutch Explorations, 1605–1756, of the North and Northwest Coast of Australia. Extracts from Journals, Log-books and Other Documents Relating to These Voyages. [Original Dutch texts]. (Amsterdam: Philo Press, 1973)
 Ryan, Simon: The Cartographic Eye: How Explorers Saw Australia. (Cambridge: Cambridge University Press, 1996)
 Schilder, Günter: Australia Unveiled: The Share of the Dutch Navigators in the Discovery of Australia. Translated from the German by Olaf Richter. (Amsterdam: Theatrum Orbis Terrarum, 1976)
 Schilder, Günter: Voyage to the Great South Land, Willem de Vlamingh, 1696–1697. Translated by C. de Heer. (Sydney: Royal Australian Historical Society, 1985)
 Schilder, Günter: In the Steps of Tasman and De Vlamingh. An Important Cartographic Document for the Discovery of Australia. (Amsterdam: Nico Israel, 1988)
 Schilder, Günter; Kok, Hans: Sailing for the East: History and Catalogue of Manuscript Charts on Vellum of the Dutch East India Company (VOC), 1602–1799. (BRILL, 2010)
 Sharp, Andrew: The Discovery of Australia. (New York: Oxford University Press, 1963)
 Sharp, Andrew: The Voyages of Abel Janszoon Tasman. (Oxford: Clarendon Press, 1968)
 Shaw, Lindsey; Wilkins, Wendy (eds.): Dutch Connections: 400 Years of Australian-Dutch Maritime Links, 1606–2006. (Sydney: Australian National Maritime Museum, 2006)
 Sigmond, J. P.; Zuiderbaan, L. H.: Dutch Discoveries of Australia: Shipwrecks, Treasures and Early Voyages off the West Coast. (Adelaide: Rigby, 1979)
 Sigmond, J. P.; Zuiderbaan, L. H.: Nederlanders ontdekken Australië: Scheepsarcheologische vondsten op het Zuidland. (Amsterdam: De Bataafsche Leeuw, 1988) [in Dutch]
 Stapel, F.W.: De Oostindische Compagnie en Australië. (Amsterdam: Van Kampen, 1937) [in Dutch]
 Stein, Stephen K.: The Sea in World History: Exploration, Travel, and Trade. (Santa Barbara, California: ABC-CLIO, 2017)
 Suárez, Thomas: Early Mapping of the Pacific: The Epic Story of Seafarers, Adventurers, and Cartographers Who Mapped the Earth's Greatest Ocean. (Singapore: Periplus Editions, 2004)
 Tasman, Abel: The Journal of Abel Jansz Tasman, 1642; with Documents Relating to His Exploration of Australia in 1644. Edited by G.H. Kenihan. (Adelaide: Australian Heritage Press, 1960)
 Tasman, Abel: Het Journaal van Abel Tasman, 1642–1643. [eds.: Vibeke Roeper & Diederick Wilderman]. (The Hague: Nationaal Archief, 2006) [in Dutch]
 Van Duivenvoorde, Wendy: The Batavia Shipwreck: An Archaeological Study of an Early Seventeenth-Century Dutch East Indiaman. (PhD diss., Texas A&M University, Dept of Anthropology, 2008) 
 Van Zanden, Henry: 1606: Discovery of Australia. (Perth: Rio Bay Enterprises, 1997)
 Veth, Peter; Sutton, Peter; Neale, Margo: Strangers on the Shore: Early Coastal Contacts in Australia. (Canberra: National Museum of Australia Press, 2008)
 Walker, James Backhouse: Abel Janszoon Tasman: His Life and Voyages, and The Discovery of Van Diemen's Land in 1642. (Hobart: Government Printer, 1896)

Journal articles, scholarly papers, essays

 Broomhall, Susan (2014), 'Emotional Encounters: Indigenous Peoples in the Dutch East India Company's Interactions with the South Lands,'. Australian Historical Studies 45(3): pp. 350–367
 Broomhall, Susan (2015), '"Quite indifferent to these things": The Role of Emotions and Conversion in the Dutch East India Company's Interactions with the South Lands,'. Journal of Religious History 39(4): 524–44. 
 Broomhall, Susan (2016), 'Dishes, Coins and Pipes: The Epistemological and Emotional Power of VOC Material Culture in Australia,'. In The Global Lives of Things: The Material Culture of Connections in the Early Modern World, edited by Anne Gerritsen & Giorgio Riello. (London: Routledge, 2016), pp. 145–61
 Broomhall, Susan (2017), 'Fire, Smoke and Ashes: Communications of Power and Emotions by Dutch East India Company Crews on the Australian Continent,'. In Fire Stories, edited by G. Moore. (New York: Punctum Books, 2017)
 Broomhall, Susan (2017), 'Shipwrecks, Sorrow, Shame and the Great Southland: The Use of Emotions in Seventeenth-Century Dutch East India Company Communicative Ritual,'. In Emotion, Ritual and Power in Europe, 1200–1920: Family, State and Church, edited by M. Bailey and K. Barclay. (Basingstoke: Palgrave Macmillan, 2017), pp. 83–103
 Broomhall, Susan (2018), 'Dirk Hartog's Sea Chest: An Affective Archaeology of VOC Objects in Australia,'; in Feeling Things: Objects and Emotions through History, edited by Stephanie Downes, Sally Holloway and Sarah Randles. (Oxford: Oxford University Press, 2018), pp. 175–91
 Donaldson, Bruce (2006), 'The Dutch Contribution to the European Discovery of Australia,'. In Nonja Peters (ed.), The Dutch Down Under, 1606–2006. (Crawley: University of Western Australia Press, 2006)
 Gaastra, Femme (1997), 'The Dutch East India Company: A Reluctant Discoverer,'. Great Circle – Journal of the Australian Association for Maritime History 19(2): 109–123 
 Gentelli, Liesel (2016), 'Provenance Determination of Silver Artefacts from the 1629 VOC Wreck Batavia using LA-ICP-MS,'. Journal of Archaeological Science [Reports] 9: 536–542. 
 Gerritsen, Rupert (2006), 'The evidence for cohabitation between Indigenous Australians, marooned Dutch mariners and VOC passengers,'; in Nonja Peters (ed.), The Dutch Down Under: 1606–2006. (University of WA Press, Sydney, 2006), pp. 38–55
 Gerritsen, Rupert (2008), 'The landing site debate: Where were Australia's first European residents marooned in 1629?', pp. 105–129; in P. Hornsby & J. Maschke (eds.) Hydro 2007 Conference Proceedings: Focus on Asia. (International Federation of Hydrographic Societies, Belrose)
 Gerritsen, Rupert (2009), 'The Batavia Mutiny: Australia's first military conflict in 1629,'. Sabretache: Journal and Proceedings of the Military Historical Society of Australia 50(4): 5–10
 Gerritsen, Rupert (2011), 'Australia's First Criminal Prosecutions in 1629'. (Canberra: Batavia Online Publishing)
 Gibbs, Martin (2002), 'Maritime Archaeology and Behavior during Crisis: The Wreck of the VOC Ship Batavia (1629),'; in John Grattan & Robin Torrence (eds.), Natural Disasters and Cultural Change. (New York: Routledge, 2002), pp. 66–86
 Green, Jeremy N. (1975), 'The VOC ship Batavia wrecked in 1629 on the Houtman Abrolhos, Western Australia,'. International Journal of Nautical Archaeology 4(1): 43–63. 
 Green, Jeremy N. (2006), 'The Dutch Down Under: Sailing Blunders,'. In Nonja Peters (ed.), The Dutch Down Under, 1606–2006. (Crawley: University of Western Australia Press, 2006)
 Guy, Richard (2015), 'Calamitous Voyages: the social space of shipwreck and mutiny narratives in the Dutch East India Company,'. Itinerario 39(1): 117–140. 
 Ketelaar, Eric (2008), 'Exploration of the Archived World: From De Vlamingh's Plate to Digital Realities,'. Archives and Manuscripts 36(2): 13–33
 McCarthy, M. (2006), 'Dutch place names in Australia,'. In Nonja Peters (ed.), The Dutch Down Under, 1606–2006. (Crawley: University of Western Australia Press, 2006)
 McCarthy, M. (2006), 'The Dutch on Australian shores: The Zuytdorp tragedy – unfinished business,'. In L. Shaw & W. Wilkins (eds.), Dutch Connections: 400 Years of Australian–Dutch Maritime Links, 1606–2006 (Sydney: Australian National Maritime Museum, 2006), pp. 94–109
 Mutch, T. D. (1942), 'The First Discovery of Australia with an Account of the Voyages of the Duyfken and the Career of William Jansz.,'. JRAHS 28(5): 303–352
 Schilder, Günter (1976), 'Organisation and Evolution of the Dutch East India Company's Hydrographic Office in the Seventeenth Century,'. Imago Mundi 28: 61–78
 Schilder, Günter (1988), 'New Holland: The Dutch Discoveries,'; in Glyndwr Williams and Alan Frost (eds.), Terra Australis to Australia. (Melbourne: Oxford University Press, 1988), pp. 83–115
 Schilder, Günter (1984), 'The Dutch Conception of New Holland in the Seventeenth and Early Eighteenth Centuries,'. The Globe: Journal of the Australian Map Circle 22: 38–46
 Schilder, Günter (1989), 'From Secret to Common Knowledge – The Dutch Discoveries,'; in John Hardy and Alan Frost (eds.), Studies from Terra Australis to Australia. (Canberra, 1989)
 Schilder, Günter (1993), 'A Continent Takes Shape: The Dutch mapping of Australia,'; in Changing Coastlines, edited by Michael Richards & Maura O'Connor. (Canberra: National Library of Australia, 1993), pp. 10–16
 Sheehan, Colin (2008), 'Strangers and Servants of the Company: The United East India Company and the Dutch Voyages to Australia,'; in Peter Veth, Margo Neale, et al. (eds.), Strangers on the Shore: Early Coastal Contacts in Australia. (Canberra: National Museum of Australia Press)
 Sigmond, Peter (2006), 'Cultural Heritage and a Piece of Pewter,'; in L. Shaw & W. Wilkins (eds.), Dutch Connections: 400 Years of Australian–Dutch Maritime Links, 1606–2006. (Sydney: Australian National Maritime Museum, 2006)
 Van Duivenvoorde, Wendy; Kaiser, Bruce; Megens, Luc; van Bronswijk, Wilhelm (2015), 'Pigments from the Zuiddorp (Zuytdorp) ship sculpture: red, white and blue?,'. Post-Medieval Archaeology 49(2): 268–290
 Yahya, Padillah; Gaudieri, Silvana; Franklin, Daniel (2010), 'DNA Analysis of Human Skeletal Remains Associated with the Batavia Mutiny of 1629,'. Records of the Western Australian Museum 26: 98–108

Primary sources

 Clark, C.M.H. ed. Select Documents in Australian History (2 vol. 1950)
 Kemp, Rod, and Marion Stanton, eds. Speaking for Australia: Parliamentary Speeches That Shaped Our Nation Allen & Unwin, 2004 online edition
 Crowley, Frank, ed. A Documentary History of Australia (5 vol. Melbourne: Wren, 1973); v.1. Colonial Australia, 1788–1840 – v.2. Colonial Australia, 1841–1874 -v.3. Colonial Australia, 1875–1900 -v.4. Modern Australia, 1901–1939 -v.5. Modern Australia, 1939–1970
 Daniels, Kay, ed. Australia's Women, a Documentary History: From a Selection of Personal Letters, Diary Entries, Pamphlets, Official Records, Government and Police Reports, Speeches, and Radio Talks (2nd ed. U of Queensland Press, 1989) 335pp. The first edition was entitled Uphill All the Way: A Documentary History of Women in Australia (1980).
 Teale, Ruth, ed. Colonial Eve: Sources On Women in Australia, 1788–1914 (Melbourne : Oxford University Press, 1978)

Further reading

External links

Australia: The Official History, by John Hirst, February 2008, The Monthly
History of the Australian nation – State Library of NSW
The Australian History page at Project Gutenberg of Australia
Bush Poetry a source of Australian History
 Australian Historical Studies, a scholarly journal
 Historical Primary Sources
 "State Library of New South Wales Online Collections"
 "Australian War Memorial Collections" 
 "Some Inspirational (Australian) People" Profiled by Laurence MacDonald Muir.
 "The Australian Empire" by Rob Robinson, 2009
 From Terra Australis to Australia, State Library of New South Wales
European discovery and the colonisation of Australia – Australian Government
 Looking For Blackfellas Point History of European settlement and relations with Aboriginal people of South Eastern Australia, Australian Broadcasting Corporation
 Royal Australian Historical Society